

29001–29100 

|-bgcolor=#E9E9E9
| 29001 || 2615 P-L || — || September 24, 1960 || Palomar || PLS || MRX || align=right | 3.3 km || 
|-id=002 bgcolor=#fefefe
| 29002 || 2708 P-L || — || September 24, 1960 || Palomar || PLS || — || align=right | 4.7 km || 
|-id=003 bgcolor=#d6d6d6
| 29003 || 2760 P-L || — || September 24, 1960 || Palomar || PLS || — || align=right | 4.3 km || 
|-id=004 bgcolor=#d6d6d6
| 29004 || 2767 P-L || — || September 24, 1960 || Palomar || PLS || THM || align=right | 9.3 km || 
|-id=005 bgcolor=#d6d6d6
| 29005 || 2784 P-L || — || September 24, 1960 || Palomar || PLS || — || align=right | 7.5 km || 
|-id=006 bgcolor=#d6d6d6
| 29006 || 3091 P-L || — || September 24, 1960 || Palomar || PLS || 629 || align=right | 4.7 km || 
|-id=007 bgcolor=#fefefe
| 29007 || 4022 P-L || — || September 24, 1960 || Palomar || PLS || FLO || align=right | 2.5 km || 
|-id=008 bgcolor=#d6d6d6
| 29008 || 4044 P-L || — || September 24, 1960 || Palomar || PLS || EOS || align=right | 6.7 km || 
|-id=009 bgcolor=#fefefe
| 29009 || 4074 P-L || — || September 24, 1960 || Palomar || PLS || MAS || align=right | 2.8 km || 
|-id=010 bgcolor=#E9E9E9
| 29010 || 4100 P-L || — || September 24, 1960 || Palomar || PLS || EUN || align=right | 3.5 km || 
|-id=011 bgcolor=#fefefe
| 29011 || 4184 P-L || — || September 24, 1960 || Palomar || PLS || — || align=right | 3.6 km || 
|-id=012 bgcolor=#d6d6d6
| 29012 || 4285 P-L || — || September 24, 1960 || Palomar || PLS || EOS || align=right | 4.3 km || 
|-id=013 bgcolor=#E9E9E9
| 29013 || 4291 P-L || — || September 24, 1960 || Palomar || PLS || — || align=right | 2.2 km || 
|-id=014 bgcolor=#d6d6d6
| 29014 || 4536 P-L || — || September 24, 1960 || Palomar || PLS || — || align=right | 8.0 km || 
|-id=015 bgcolor=#E9E9E9
| 29015 || 4544 P-L || — || September 24, 1960 || Palomar || PLS || — || align=right | 3.2 km || 
|-id=016 bgcolor=#E9E9E9
| 29016 || 4591 P-L || — || September 24, 1960 || Palomar || PLS || — || align=right | 4.5 km || 
|-id=017 bgcolor=#d6d6d6
| 29017 || 4601 P-L || — || September 24, 1960 || Palomar || PLS || — || align=right | 7.1 km || 
|-id=018 bgcolor=#fefefe
| 29018 || 6062 P-L || — || September 24, 1960 || Palomar || PLS || NYS || align=right | 6.3 km || 
|-id=019 bgcolor=#d6d6d6
| 29019 || 6095 P-L || — || September 24, 1960 || Palomar || PLS || HYGslow? || align=right | 7.7 km || 
|-id=020 bgcolor=#E9E9E9
| 29020 || 6274 P-L || — || September 24, 1960 || Palomar || PLS || — || align=right | 3.4 km || 
|-id=021 bgcolor=#fefefe
| 29021 || 6613 P-L || — || September 24, 1960 || Palomar || PLS || — || align=right | 1.7 km || 
|-id=022 bgcolor=#fefefe
| 29022 || 6630 P-L || — || September 24, 1960 || Palomar || PLS || — || align=right | 2.0 km || 
|-id=023 bgcolor=#d6d6d6
| 29023 || 6667 P-L || — || September 24, 1960 || Palomar || PLS || EOS || align=right | 4.9 km || 
|-id=024 bgcolor=#d6d6d6
| 29024 || 6685 P-L || — || September 24, 1960 || Palomar || PLS || — || align=right | 3.2 km || 
|-id=025 bgcolor=#E9E9E9
| 29025 || 6710 P-L || — || September 24, 1960 || Palomar || PLS || — || align=right | 4.0 km || 
|-id=026 bgcolor=#E9E9E9
| 29026 || 6774 P-L || — || September 24, 1960 || Palomar || PLS || — || align=right | 2.8 km || 
|-id=027 bgcolor=#E9E9E9
| 29027 || 7587 P-L || — || October 17, 1960 || Palomar || PLS || — || align=right | 2.8 km || 
|-id=028 bgcolor=#E9E9E9
| 29028 || 9097 P-L || — || October 17, 1960 || Palomar || PLS || RAF || align=right | 4.9 km || 
|-id=029 bgcolor=#E9E9E9
| 29029 || 9549 P-L || — || October 17, 1960 || Palomar || PLS || GER || align=right | 5.8 km || 
|-id=030 bgcolor=#fefefe
| 29030 || 1034 T-1 || — || March 25, 1971 || Palomar || PLS || — || align=right | 2.2 km || 
|-id=031 bgcolor=#fefefe
| 29031 || 1132 T-1 || — || March 25, 1971 || Palomar || PLS || NYS || align=right | 2.2 km || 
|-id=032 bgcolor=#fefefe
| 29032 || 2059 T-1 || — || March 25, 1971 || Palomar || PLS || PHO || align=right | 4.2 km || 
|-id=033 bgcolor=#d6d6d6
| 29033 || 2085 T-1 || — || March 25, 1971 || Palomar || PLS || THM || align=right | 8.6 km || 
|-id=034 bgcolor=#d6d6d6
| 29034 || 2149 T-1 || — || March 25, 1971 || Palomar || PLS || — || align=right | 13 km || 
|-id=035 bgcolor=#fefefe
| 29035 || 2214 T-1 || — || March 25, 1971 || Palomar || PLS || — || align=right | 3.2 km || 
|-id=036 bgcolor=#d6d6d6
| 29036 || 3075 T-1 || — || March 26, 1971 || Palomar || PLS || THM || align=right | 11 km || 
|-id=037 bgcolor=#fefefe
| 29037 || 3165 T-1 || — || March 26, 1971 || Palomar || PLS || — || align=right | 2.5 km || 
|-id=038 bgcolor=#E9E9E9
| 29038 || 4030 T-1 || — || March 26, 1971 || Palomar || PLS || GEF || align=right | 5.0 km || 
|-id=039 bgcolor=#E9E9E9
| 29039 || 4514 T-1 || — || May 13, 1971 || Palomar || PLS || — || align=right | 4.1 km || 
|-id=040 bgcolor=#fefefe
| 29040 || 1002 T-2 || — || September 29, 1973 || Palomar || PLS || — || align=right | 2.7 km || 
|-id=041 bgcolor=#d6d6d6
| 29041 || 1050 T-2 || — || September 29, 1973 || Palomar || PLS || — || align=right | 8.2 km || 
|-id=042 bgcolor=#d6d6d6
| 29042 || 1426 T-2 || — || September 29, 1973 || Palomar || PLS || — || align=right | 7.7 km || 
|-id=043 bgcolor=#E9E9E9
| 29043 || 2024 T-2 || — || September 29, 1973 || Palomar || PLS || GEF || align=right | 4.7 km || 
|-id=044 bgcolor=#E9E9E9
| 29044 || 2154 T-2 || — || September 29, 1973 || Palomar || PLS || — || align=right | 2.8 km || 
|-id=045 bgcolor=#fefefe
| 29045 || 2255 T-2 || — || September 29, 1973 || Palomar || PLS || FLO || align=right | 2.2 km || 
|-id=046 bgcolor=#d6d6d6
| 29046 || 2268 T-2 || — || September 29, 1973 || Palomar || PLS || HYG || align=right | 5.7 km || 
|-id=047 bgcolor=#d6d6d6
| 29047 || 2278 T-2 || — || September 29, 1973 || Palomar || PLS || — || align=right | 5.8 km || 
|-id=048 bgcolor=#E9E9E9
| 29048 || 3069 T-2 || — || September 30, 1973 || Palomar || PLS || — || align=right | 3.1 km || 
|-id=049 bgcolor=#fefefe
| 29049 || 3083 T-2 || — || September 30, 1973 || Palomar || PLS || — || align=right | 2.0 km || 
|-id=050 bgcolor=#d6d6d6
| 29050 || 3333 T-2 || — || September 25, 1973 || Palomar || PLS || KOR || align=right | 3.2 km || 
|-id=051 bgcolor=#fefefe
| 29051 || 4212 T-2 || — || September 29, 1973 || Palomar || PLS || — || align=right | 3.5 km || 
|-id=052 bgcolor=#E9E9E9
| 29052 || 4258 T-2 || — || September 29, 1973 || Palomar || PLS || — || align=right | 2.7 km || 
|-id=053 bgcolor=#d6d6d6
| 29053 Muskau || 4466 T-2 ||  || September 30, 1973 || Palomar || PLS || 3:2 || align=right | 10 km || 
|-id=054 bgcolor=#E9E9E9
| 29054 || 5097 T-2 || — || September 25, 1973 || Palomar || PLS || INO || align=right | 4.6 km || 
|-id=055 bgcolor=#d6d6d6
| 29055 || 5118 T-2 || — || September 25, 1973 || Palomar || PLS || URS || align=right | 6.0 km || 
|-id=056 bgcolor=#E9E9E9
| 29056 || 1055 T-3 || — || October 17, 1977 || Palomar || PLS || — || align=right | 2.8 km || 
|-id=057 bgcolor=#E9E9E9
| 29057 || 1083 T-3 || — || October 17, 1977 || Palomar || PLS || — || align=right | 2.2 km || 
|-id=058 bgcolor=#fefefe
| 29058 || 2077 T-3 || — || October 16, 1977 || Palomar || PLS || — || align=right | 4.7 km || 
|-id=059 bgcolor=#fefefe
| 29059 || 2151 T-3 || — || October 16, 1977 || Palomar || PLS || — || align=right | 2.9 km || 
|-id=060 bgcolor=#fefefe
| 29060 || 2157 T-3 || — || October 16, 1977 || Palomar || PLS || FLO || align=right | 3.3 km || 
|-id=061 bgcolor=#E9E9E9
| 29061 || 2193 T-3 || — || October 16, 1977 || Palomar || PLS || — || align=right | 2.7 km || 
|-id=062 bgcolor=#fefefe
| 29062 || 2324 T-3 || — || October 16, 1977 || Palomar || PLS || FLO || align=right | 2.2 km || 
|-id=063 bgcolor=#fefefe
| 29063 || 2369 T-3 || — || October 16, 1977 || Palomar || PLS || FLO || align=right | 2.1 km || 
|-id=064 bgcolor=#E9E9E9
| 29064 || 3129 T-3 || — || October 16, 1977 || Palomar || PLS || — || align=right | 3.3 km || 
|-id=065 bgcolor=#E9E9E9
| 29065 || 3447 T-3 || — || October 16, 1977 || Palomar || PLS || — || align=right | 2.6 km || 
|-id=066 bgcolor=#fefefe
| 29066 || 3527 T-3 || — || October 16, 1977 || Palomar || PLS || V || align=right | 1.6 km || 
|-id=067 bgcolor=#d6d6d6
| 29067 || 3856 T-3 || — || October 16, 1977 || Palomar || PLS || — || align=right | 7.3 km || 
|-id=068 bgcolor=#fefefe
| 29068 || 4234 T-3 || — || October 16, 1977 || Palomar || PLS || PHO || align=right | 2.8 km || 
|-id=069 bgcolor=#fefefe
| 29069 || 4310 T-3 || — || October 16, 1977 || Palomar || PLS || FLO || align=right | 3.0 km || 
|-id=070 bgcolor=#E9E9E9
| 29070 || 4316 T-3 || — || October 16, 1977 || Palomar || PLS || — || align=right | 2.6 km || 
|-id=071 bgcolor=#d6d6d6
| 29071 || 5048 T-3 || — || October 16, 1977 || Palomar || PLS || 7:4 || align=right | 11 km || 
|-id=072 bgcolor=#fefefe
| 29072 || 5089 T-3 || — || October 16, 1977 || Palomar || PLS || V || align=right | 1.5 km || 
|-id=073 bgcolor=#fefefe
| 29073 || 5130 T-3 || — || October 16, 1977 || Palomar || PLS || — || align=right | 2.0 km || 
|-id=074 bgcolor=#d6d6d6
| 29074 || 5160 T-3 || — || October 16, 1977 || Palomar || PLS || — || align=right | 4.3 km || 
|-id=075 bgcolor=#FFC2E0
| 29075 || 1950 DA || — || February 22, 1950 || Mount Hamilton || C. A. Wirtanen || APO +1kmPHAfast || align=right | 2.0 km || 
|-id=076 bgcolor=#E9E9E9
| 29076 ||  || — || October 4, 1972 || Hamburg-Bergedorf || L. Kohoutek || — || align=right | 5.3 km || 
|-id=077 bgcolor=#fefefe
| 29077 || 1975 SR || — || September 30, 1975 || Palomar || S. J. Bus || NYS || align=right | 2.3 km || 
|-id=078 bgcolor=#d6d6d6
| 29078 ||  || — || September 30, 1975 || Palomar || S. J. Bus || — || align=right | 6.7 km || 
|-id=079 bgcolor=#fefefe
| 29079 || 1975 XD || — || December 1, 1975 || Cerro El Roble || C. Torres, S. Barros || V || align=right | 2.3 km || 
|-id=080 bgcolor=#d6d6d6
| 29080 Astrocourier || 1978 RK ||  || September 1, 1978 || Nauchnij || N. S. Chernykh || — || align=right | 18 km || 
|-id=081 bgcolor=#fefefe
| 29081 Krymradio ||  ||  || September 27, 1978 || Nauchnij || L. I. Chernykh || MAS || align=right | 3.0 km || 
|-id=082 bgcolor=#fefefe
| 29082 ||  || — || November 7, 1978 || Palomar || E. F. Helin, S. J. Bus || FLO || align=right | 2.1 km || 
|-id=083 bgcolor=#d6d6d6
| 29083 ||  || — || June 25, 1979 || Siding Spring || E. F. Helin, S. J. Bus || EOS || align=right | 7.4 km || 
|-id=084 bgcolor=#fefefe
| 29084 ||  || — || June 25, 1979 || Siding Spring || E. F. Helin, S. J. Bus || ERI || align=right | 1.9 km || 
|-id=085 bgcolor=#E9E9E9
| 29085 Sethanne || 1979 SD ||  || September 17, 1979 || Harvard Observatory || Harvard Obs. || — || align=right | 3.3 km || 
|-id=086 bgcolor=#E9E9E9
| 29086 ||  || — || August 4, 1980 || Siding Spring || Edinburgh Obs. || MAR || align=right | 5.2 km || 
|-id=087 bgcolor=#fefefe
| 29087 ||  || — || November 1, 1980 || Palomar || S. J. Bus || — || align=right | 5.5 km || 
|-id=088 bgcolor=#E9E9E9
| 29088 ||  || — || February 28, 1981 || Siding Spring || S. J. Bus || ADE || align=right | 9.3 km || 
|-id=089 bgcolor=#E9E9E9
| 29089 ||  || — || February 28, 1981 || Siding Spring || S. J. Bus || — || align=right | 6.1 km || 
|-id=090 bgcolor=#d6d6d6
| 29090 ||  || — || March 2, 1981 || Siding Spring || S. J. Bus || — || align=right | 9.4 km || 
|-id=091 bgcolor=#d6d6d6
| 29091 ||  || — || March 1, 1981 || Siding Spring || S. J. Bus || — || align=right | 11 km || 
|-id=092 bgcolor=#E9E9E9
| 29092 ||  || — || March 1, 1981 || Siding Spring || S. J. Bus || — || align=right | 6.7 km || 
|-id=093 bgcolor=#fefefe
| 29093 ||  || — || March 1, 1981 || Siding Spring || S. J. Bus || — || align=right | 1.6 km || 
|-id=094 bgcolor=#fefefe
| 29094 ||  || — || March 1, 1981 || Siding Spring || S. J. Bus || — || align=right | 2.7 km || 
|-id=095 bgcolor=#fefefe
| 29095 ||  || — || March 7, 1981 || Siding Spring || S. J. Bus || — || align=right | 3.4 km || 
|-id=096 bgcolor=#fefefe
| 29096 ||  || — || March 7, 1981 || Siding Spring || S. J. Bus || NYS || align=right | 1.5 km || 
|-id=097 bgcolor=#fefefe
| 29097 ||  || — || March 1, 1981 || Siding Spring || S. J. Bus || V || align=right | 1.8 km || 
|-id=098 bgcolor=#fefefe
| 29098 ||  || — || March 6, 1981 || Siding Spring || S. J. Bus || — || align=right | 3.0 km || 
|-id=099 bgcolor=#d6d6d6
| 29099 ||  || — || March 6, 1981 || Siding Spring || S. J. Bus || — || align=right | 9.3 km || 
|-id=100 bgcolor=#d6d6d6
| 29100 ||  || — || March 2, 1981 || Siding Spring || S. J. Bus || HYG || align=right | 5.5 km || 
|}

29101–29200 

|-bgcolor=#E9E9E9
| 29101 ||  || — || March 2, 1981 || Siding Spring || S. J. Bus || HEN || align=right | 3.1 km || 
|-id=102 bgcolor=#E9E9E9
| 29102 ||  || — || March 2, 1981 || Siding Spring || S. J. Bus || — || align=right | 7.6 km || 
|-id=103 bgcolor=#fefefe
| 29103 ||  || — || March 2, 1981 || Siding Spring || S. J. Bus || — || align=right | 1.7 km || 
|-id=104 bgcolor=#fefefe
| 29104 ||  || — || March 2, 1981 || Siding Spring || S. J. Bus || NYS || align=right | 1.4 km || 
|-id=105 bgcolor=#fefefe
| 29105 ||  || — || March 2, 1981 || Siding Spring || S. J. Bus || — || align=right | 1.6 km || 
|-id=106 bgcolor=#fefefe
| 29106 ||  || — || March 2, 1981 || Siding Spring || S. J. Bus || V || align=right | 1.8 km || 
|-id=107 bgcolor=#d6d6d6
| 29107 ||  || — || March 2, 1981 || Siding Spring || S. J. Bus || ALA || align=right | 10 km || 
|-id=108 bgcolor=#E9E9E9
| 29108 ||  || — || March 2, 1981 || Siding Spring || S. J. Bus || PAE || align=right | 6.8 km || 
|-id=109 bgcolor=#E9E9E9
| 29109 ||  || — || March 6, 1981 || Siding Spring || S. J. Bus || WIT || align=right | 3.5 km || 
|-id=110 bgcolor=#d6d6d6
| 29110 ||  || — || March 1, 1981 || Siding Spring || S. J. Bus || HYG || align=right | 8.0 km || 
|-id=111 bgcolor=#fefefe
| 29111 ||  || — || March 1, 1981 || Siding Spring || S. J. Bus || — || align=right | 1.8 km || 
|-id=112 bgcolor=#d6d6d6
| 29112 ||  || — || March 1, 1981 || Siding Spring || S. J. Bus || HYG || align=right | 6.4 km || 
|-id=113 bgcolor=#E9E9E9
| 29113 ||  || — || March 1, 1981 || Siding Spring || S. J. Bus || GEF || align=right | 2.9 km || 
|-id=114 bgcolor=#fefefe
| 29114 ||  || — || March 1, 1981 || Siding Spring || S. J. Bus || — || align=right | 1.2 km || 
|-id=115 bgcolor=#E9E9E9
| 29115 ||  || — || March 1, 1981 || Siding Spring || S. J. Bus || NEM || align=right | 4.2 km || 
|-id=116 bgcolor=#d6d6d6
| 29116 ||  || — || March 2, 1981 || Siding Spring || S. J. Bus || — || align=right | 7.3 km || 
|-id=117 bgcolor=#E9E9E9
| 29117 ||  || — || March 2, 1981 || Siding Spring || S. J. Bus || NEM || align=right | 6.4 km || 
|-id=118 bgcolor=#fefefe
| 29118 ||  || — || March 3, 1981 || Siding Spring || S. J. Bus || MAS || align=right | 1.4 km || 
|-id=119 bgcolor=#d6d6d6
| 29119 ||  || — || March 1, 1981 || Siding Spring || S. J. Bus || HYG || align=right | 7.8 km || 
|-id=120 bgcolor=#d6d6d6
| 29120 ||  || — || March 1, 1981 || Siding Spring || S. J. Bus || HYG || align=right | 7.8 km || 
|-id=121 bgcolor=#fefefe
| 29121 ||  || — || August 23, 1981 || La Silla || H. Debehogne || FLO || align=right | 2.0 km || 
|-id=122 bgcolor=#fefefe
| 29122 Vasadze ||  ||  || December 24, 1982 || Nauchnij || L. G. Karachkina || — || align=right | 4.1 km || 
|-id=123 bgcolor=#E9E9E9
| 29123 ||  || — || September 2, 1983 || Anderson Mesa || N. G. Thomas || — || align=right | 5.5 km || 
|-id=124 bgcolor=#fefefe
| 29124 ||  || — || September 28, 1984 || La Silla || H. Debehogne || FLO || align=right | 1.7 km || 
|-id=125 bgcolor=#fefefe
| 29125 Kyivphysfak ||  ||  || December 17, 1984 || Nauchnij || L. G. Karachkina || FLO || align=right | 2.9 km || 
|-id=126 bgcolor=#fefefe
| 29126 ||  || — || February 11, 1985 || La Silla || H. Debehogne || PHO || align=right | 3.6 km || 
|-id=127 bgcolor=#E9E9E9
| 29127 ||  || — || March 24, 1985 || Anderson Mesa || B. A. Skiff || — || align=right | 11 km || 
|-id=128 bgcolor=#E9E9E9
| 29128 ||  || — || September 13, 1985 || Kitt Peak || Spacewatch || — || align=right | 3.7 km || 
|-id=129 bgcolor=#fefefe
| 29129 ||  || — || September 6, 1985 || La Silla || H. Debehogne || — || align=right | 5.8 km || 
|-id=130 bgcolor=#E9E9E9
| 29130 ||  || — || March 9, 1986 || Siding Spring || C.-I. Lagerkvist || — || align=right | 8.6 km || 
|-id=131 bgcolor=#fefefe
| 29131 ||  || — || August 27, 1986 || La Silla || H. Debehogne || MAS || align=right | 2.6 km || 
|-id=132 bgcolor=#E9E9E9
| 29132 Bradpitt ||  ||  || January 22, 1987 || La Silla || E. W. Elst || — || align=right | 3.1 km || 
|-id=133 bgcolor=#E9E9E9
| 29133 Vargas ||  ||  || May 29, 1987 || Palomar || C. S. Shoemaker, E. M. Shoemaker || — || align=right | 6.6 km || 
|-id=134 bgcolor=#fefefe
| 29134 || 1987 RW || — || September 12, 1987 || La Silla || H. Debehogne || FLO || align=right | 4.6 km || 
|-id=135 bgcolor=#fefefe
| 29135 ||  || — || September 21, 1987 || Smolyan || E. W. Elst || V || align=right | 2.6 km || 
|-id=136 bgcolor=#E9E9E9
| 29136 ||  || — || September 25, 1987 || Brorfelde || P. Jensen || — || align=right | 3.4 km || 
|-id=137 bgcolor=#fefefe
| 29137 Alanboss ||  ||  || October 18, 1987 || Palomar || C. S. Shoemaker, E. M. Shoemaker || PHO || align=right | 2.5 km || 
|-id=138 bgcolor=#d6d6d6
| 29138 ||  || — || January 20, 1988 || La Silla || H. Debehogne || — || align=right | 6.5 km || 
|-id=139 bgcolor=#fefefe
| 29139 || 1988 CP || — || February 15, 1988 || Kushiro || S. Ueda, H. Kaneda || — || align=right | 7.1 km || 
|-id=140 bgcolor=#fefefe
| 29140 ||  || — || February 13, 1988 || La Silla || E. W. Elst || V || align=right | 2.4 km || 
|-id=141 bgcolor=#fefefe
| 29141 ||  || — || February 13, 1988 || La Silla || E. W. Elst || — || align=right | 2.7 km || 
|-id=142 bgcolor=#fefefe
| 29142 ||  || — || February 15, 1988 || La Silla || E. W. Elst || MAS || align=right | 3.0 km || 
|-id=143 bgcolor=#d6d6d6
| 29143 || 1988 DK || — || February 22, 1988 || Siding Spring || R. H. McNaught || — || align=right | 5.2 km || 
|-id=144 bgcolor=#fefefe
| 29144 || 1988 FB || — || March 16, 1988 || Kushiro || M. Matsuyama, K. Watanabe || NYS || align=right | 3.7 km || 
|-id=145 bgcolor=#fefefe
| 29145 || 1988 FE || — || March 16, 1988 || Kushiro || S. Ueda, H. Kaneda || — || align=right | 4.2 km || 
|-id=146 bgcolor=#fefefe
| 29146 McHone || 1988 FN ||  || March 17, 1988 || Palomar || C. S. Shoemaker, E. M. Shoemaker || — || align=right | 3.8 km || 
|-id=147 bgcolor=#fefefe
| 29147 || 1988 GG || — || April 11, 1988 || Kushiro || S. Ueda, H. Kaneda || PHO || align=right | 4.3 km || 
|-id=148 bgcolor=#d6d6d6
| 29148 Palzer || 1988 JE ||  || May 10, 1988 || La Silla || W. Landgraf || — || align=right | 10 km || 
|-id=149 bgcolor=#E9E9E9
| 29149 ||  || — || September 9, 1988 || Brorfelde || P. Jensen || MAR || align=right | 5.1 km || 
|-id=150 bgcolor=#E9E9E9
| 29150 ||  || — || September 2, 1988 || La Silla || H. Debehogne || MAR || align=right | 5.0 km || 
|-id=151 bgcolor=#E9E9E9
| 29151 ||  || — || September 14, 1988 || Cerro Tololo || S. J. Bus || — || align=right | 8.5 km || 
|-id=152 bgcolor=#fefefe
| 29152 ||  || — || September 14, 1988 || Cerro Tololo || S. J. Bus || — || align=right | 2.6 km || 
|-id=153 bgcolor=#E9E9E9
| 29153 ||  || — || September 16, 1988 || Cerro Tololo || S. J. Bus || — || align=right | 3.6 km || 
|-id=154 bgcolor=#E9E9E9
| 29154 ||  || — || November 3, 1988 || Brorfelde || P. Jensen || EUN || align=right | 4.2 km || 
|-id=155 bgcolor=#E9E9E9
| 29155 || 1988 XE || — || December 2, 1988 || Kushiro || S. Ueda, H. Kaneda || — || align=right | 10 km || 
|-id=156 bgcolor=#d6d6d6
| 29156 || 1989 CH || — || February 3, 1989 || Kushiro || S. Ueda, H. Kaneda || — || align=right | 7.1 km || 
|-id=157 bgcolor=#fefefe
| 29157 Higashinihon ||  ||  || March 11, 1989 || Geisei || T. Seki || FLO || align=right | 3.2 km || 
|-id=158 bgcolor=#d6d6d6
| 29158 ||  || — || March 2, 1989 || La Silla || E. W. Elst || — || align=right | 4.9 km || 
|-id=159 bgcolor=#fefefe
| 29159 || 1989 GB || — || April 2, 1989 || Kitami || T. Fujii, K. Watanabe || — || align=right | 6.8 km || 
|-id=160 bgcolor=#E9E9E9
| 29160 São Paulo ||  ||  || September 26, 1989 || La Silla || E. W. Elst || — || align=right | 4.1 km || 
|-id=161 bgcolor=#E9E9E9
| 29161 ||  || — || September 26, 1989 || La Silla || E. W. Elst || — || align=right | 7.7 km || 
|-id=162 bgcolor=#E9E9E9
| 29162 ||  || — || September 26, 1989 || La Silla || E. W. Elst || MAR || align=right | 5.1 km || 
|-id=163 bgcolor=#E9E9E9
| 29163 ||  || — || September 26, 1989 || Calar Alto || J. M. Baur, K. Birkle || MAR || align=right | 2.9 km || 
|-id=164 bgcolor=#E9E9E9
| 29164 || 1989 UA || — || October 20, 1989 || Kani || Y. Mizuno, T. Furuta || — || align=right | 6.1 km || 
|-id=165 bgcolor=#E9E9E9
| 29165 ||  || — || October 26, 1989 || Kushiro || S. Ueda, H. Kaneda || — || align=right | 3.4 km || 
|-id=166 bgcolor=#E9E9E9
| 29166 ||  || — || November 3, 1989 || La Silla || E. W. Elst || EUN || align=right | 3.5 km || 
|-id=167 bgcolor=#E9E9E9
| 29167 ||  || — || November 29, 1989 || Kitami || K. Endate, K. Watanabe || RAF || align=right | 5.7 km || 
|-id=168 bgcolor=#fefefe
| 29168 || 1990 KJ || — || May 20, 1990 || Palomar || E. F. Helin || PHO || align=right | 4.9 km || 
|-id=169 bgcolor=#d6d6d6
| 29169 ||  || — || July 22, 1990 || Palomar || E. F. Helin || — || align=right | 8.0 km || 
|-id=170 bgcolor=#d6d6d6
| 29170 ||  || — || July 27, 1990 || Palomar || H. E. Holt || EOS || align=right | 7.2 km || 
|-id=171 bgcolor=#fefefe
| 29171 ||  || — || August 28, 1990 || Palomar || H. E. Holt || V || align=right | 3.1 km || 
|-id=172 bgcolor=#d6d6d6
| 29172 ||  || — || August 23, 1990 || Palomar || H. E. Holt || — || align=right | 8.0 km || 
|-id=173 bgcolor=#fefefe
| 29173 ||  || — || August 24, 1990 || Palomar || H. E. Holt || — || align=right | 2.8 km || 
|-id=174 bgcolor=#d6d6d6
| 29174 ||  || — || August 20, 1990 || La Silla || E. W. Elst || — || align=right | 8.4 km || 
|-id=175 bgcolor=#fefefe
| 29175 ||  || — || August 20, 1990 || La Silla || E. W. Elst || FLO || align=right | 2.8 km || 
|-id=176 bgcolor=#d6d6d6
| 29176 ||  || — || August 16, 1990 || La Silla || E. W. Elst || — || align=right | 6.1 km || 
|-id=177 bgcolor=#d6d6d6
| 29177 ||  || — || September 13, 1990 || La Silla || H. Debehogne || THM || align=right | 9.1 km || 
|-id=178 bgcolor=#fefefe
| 29178 ||  || — || September 13, 1990 || Palomar || H. E. Holt || — || align=right | 2.6 km || 
|-id=179 bgcolor=#fefefe
| 29179 ||  || — || September 14, 1990 || La Silla || E. W. Elst || — || align=right | 2.3 km || 
|-id=180 bgcolor=#FA8072
| 29180 ||  || — || September 22, 1990 || Palomar || B. Roman || — || align=right | 3.9 km || 
|-id=181 bgcolor=#fefefe
| 29181 ||  || — || September 22, 1990 || La Silla || E. W. Elst || V || align=right | 2.1 km || 
|-id=182 bgcolor=#d6d6d6
| 29182 ||  || — || September 22, 1990 || La Silla || E. W. Elst || — || align=right | 7.6 km || 
|-id=183 bgcolor=#fefefe
| 29183 ||  || — || September 22, 1990 || La Silla || E. W. Elst || NYS || align=right | 2.0 km || 
|-id=184 bgcolor=#fefefe
| 29184 ||  || — || September 17, 1990 || Palomar || C. M. Olmstead || — || align=right | 4.8 km || 
|-id=185 bgcolor=#d6d6d6
| 29185 Reich ||  ||  || October 13, 1990 || Tautenburg Observatory || L. D. Schmadel, F. Börngen || — || align=right | 13 km || 
|-id=186 bgcolor=#fefefe
| 29186 Lake Tekapo ||  ||  || October 26, 1990 || Geisei || T. Seki || V || align=right | 2.6 km || 
|-id=187 bgcolor=#d6d6d6
| 29187 Lemonnier ||  ||  || October 16, 1990 || La Silla || E. W. Elst || — || align=right | 11 km || 
|-id=188 bgcolor=#fefefe
| 29188 ||  || — || October 16, 1990 || La Silla || E. W. Elst || NYS || align=right | 4.8 km || 
|-id=189 bgcolor=#d6d6d6
| 29189 Udinsk ||  ||  || October 16, 1990 || La Silla || E. W. Elst || — || align=right | 8.4 km || 
|-id=190 bgcolor=#d6d6d6
| 29190 ||  || — || October 16, 1990 || La Silla || E. W. Elst || — || align=right | 11 km || 
|-id=191 bgcolor=#fefefe
| 29191 ||  || — || October 16, 1990 || La Silla || E. W. Elst || FLO || align=right | 2.5 km || 
|-id=192 bgcolor=#d6d6d6
| 29192 ||  || — || November 11, 1990 || Oohira || T. Urata || — || align=right | 12 km || 
|-id=193 bgcolor=#d6d6d6
| 29193 Dolphyn ||  ||  || November 18, 1990 || La Silla || E. W. Elst || MEL || align=right | 14 km || 
|-id=194 bgcolor=#fefefe
| 29194 ||  || — || November 16, 1990 || La Silla || E. W. Elst || V || align=right | 2.7 km || 
|-id=195 bgcolor=#fefefe
| 29195 ||  || — || November 16, 1990 || La Silla || E. W. Elst || — || align=right | 2.6 km || 
|-id=196 bgcolor=#C2FFFF
| 29196 Dius || 1990 YY ||  || December 19, 1990 || McGraw-Hill || R. P. Binzel || L5 || align=right | 16 km || 
|-id=197 bgcolor=#fefefe
| 29197 Gleim ||  ||  || January 15, 1991 || Tautenburg Observatory || F. Börngen || EUT || align=right | 2.5 km || 
|-id=198 bgcolor=#E9E9E9
| 29198 Weathers || 1991 DW ||  || February 18, 1991 || Palomar || E. F. Helin || — || align=right | 6.4 km || 
|-id=199 bgcolor=#E9E9E9
| 29199 Himeji || 1991 FZ ||  || March 17, 1991 || Geisei || T. Seki || — || align=right | 13 km || 
|-id=200 bgcolor=#E9E9E9
| 29200 ||  || — || March 20, 1991 || La Silla || H. Debehogne || EUN || align=right | 7.5 km || 
|}

29201–29300 

|-bgcolor=#E9E9E9
| 29201 ||  || — || April 8, 1991 || La Silla || E. W. Elst || ADE || align=right | 12 km || 
|-id=202 bgcolor=#E9E9E9
| 29202 ||  || — || April 8, 1991 || La Silla || E. W. Elst || ADE || align=right | 9.6 km || 
|-id=203 bgcolor=#E9E9E9
| 29203 Schnitger ||  ||  || April 9, 1991 || Tautenburg Observatory || F. Börngen || — || align=right | 3.7 km || 
|-id=204 bgcolor=#E9E9E9
| 29204 Ladegast ||  ||  || April 11, 1991 || Tautenburg Observatory || F. Börngen || — || align=right | 3.5 km || 
|-id=205 bgcolor=#E9E9E9
| 29205 ||  || — || July 11, 1991 || La Silla || H. Debehogne || PAD || align=right | 9.2 km || 
|-id=206 bgcolor=#fefefe
| 29206 ||  || — || August 7, 1991 || Palomar || H. E. Holt || — || align=right | 2.7 km || 
|-id=207 bgcolor=#fefefe
| 29207 ||  || — || September 6, 1991 || Haute Provence || E. W. Elst || FLO || align=right | 2.7 km || 
|-id=208 bgcolor=#fefefe
| 29208 Halorentz ||  ||  || September 9, 1991 || Tautenburg Observatory || F. Börngen, L. D. Schmadel || FLO || align=right | 2.8 km || 
|-id=209 bgcolor=#fefefe
| 29209 ||  || — || September 12, 1991 || Palomar || H. E. Holt || — || align=right | 2.2 km || 
|-id=210 bgcolor=#E9E9E9
| 29210 Robertbrown ||  ||  || September 4, 1991 || La Silla || E. W. Elst || — || align=right | 9.1 km || 
|-id=211 bgcolor=#d6d6d6
| 29211 ||  || — || September 15, 1991 || Palomar || H. E. Holt || KOR || align=right | 6.0 km || 
|-id=212 bgcolor=#d6d6d6
| 29212 Zeeman ||  ||  || September 10, 1991 || Tautenburg Observatory || F. Börngen || KOR || align=right | 3.9 km || 
|-id=213 bgcolor=#fefefe
| 29213 || 1991 SJ || — || September 29, 1991 || Siding Spring || R. H. McNaught || FLO || align=right | 2.5 km || 
|-id=214 bgcolor=#d6d6d6
| 29214 Apitzsch ||  ||  || October 2, 1991 || Tautenburg Observatory || L. D. Schmadel, F. Börngen || — || align=right | 4.8 km || 
|-id=215 bgcolor=#fefefe
| 29215 || 1991 UE || — || October 18, 1991 || Kushiro || S. Ueda, H. Kaneda || NYS || align=right | 5.1 km || 
|-id=216 bgcolor=#d6d6d6
| 29216 ||  || — || November 2, 1991 || La Silla || E. W. Elst || EOS || align=right | 10 km || 
|-id=217 bgcolor=#d6d6d6
| 29217 ||  || — || November 4, 1991 || Kushiro || S. Ueda, H. Kaneda || — || align=right | 8.6 km || 
|-id=218 bgcolor=#d6d6d6
| 29218 || 1992 AY || — || January 4, 1992 || Okutama || T. Hioki, S. Hayakawa || — || align=right | 13 km || 
|-id=219 bgcolor=#fefefe
| 29219 || 1992 BJ || — || January 24, 1992 || Kushiro || S. Ueda, H. Kaneda || NYS || align=right | 6.3 km || 
|-id=220 bgcolor=#d6d6d6
| 29220 Xavierbaptista ||  ||  || January 30, 1992 || La Silla || E. W. Elst || — || align=right | 7.3 km || 
|-id=221 bgcolor=#fefefe
| 29221 ||  || — || January 28, 1992 || Kitt Peak || Spacewatch || FLO || align=right | 2.9 km || 
|-id=222 bgcolor=#fefefe
| 29222 ||  || — || January 29, 1992 || Kitt Peak || Spacewatch || — || align=right | 1.7 km || 
|-id=223 bgcolor=#fefefe
| 29223 ||  || — || February 23, 1992 || Kitt Peak || Spacewatch || NYS || align=right | 2.2 km || 
|-id=224 bgcolor=#fefefe
| 29224 ||  || — || February 29, 1992 || La Silla || UESAC || — || align=right | 2.9 km || 
|-id=225 bgcolor=#fefefe
| 29225 ||  || — || February 29, 1992 || La Silla || UESAC || — || align=right | 5.0 km || 
|-id=226 bgcolor=#fefefe
| 29226 ||  || — || February 29, 1992 || La Silla || UESAC || — || align=right | 5.6 km || 
|-id=227 bgcolor=#fefefe
| 29227 Wegener ||  ||  || February 29, 1992 || Tautenburg Observatory || F. Börngen || — || align=right | 3.7 km || 
|-id=228 bgcolor=#fefefe
| 29228 || 1992 EC || — || March 2, 1992 || Kushiro || S. Ueda, H. Kaneda || V || align=right | 2.7 km || 
|-id=229 bgcolor=#fefefe
| 29229 ||  || — || March 10, 1992 || Dynic || A. Sugie || PHO || align=right | 4.3 km || 
|-id=230 bgcolor=#d6d6d6
| 29230 ||  || — || March 1, 1992 || La Silla || UESAC || THM || align=right | 11 km || 
|-id=231 bgcolor=#d6d6d6
| 29231 ||  || — || March 1, 1992 || La Silla || UESAC || slow || align=right | 8.0 km || 
|-id=232 bgcolor=#fefefe
| 29232 ||  || — || March 1, 1992 || La Silla || UESAC || NYS || align=right | 3.0 km || 
|-id=233 bgcolor=#fefefe
| 29233 ||  || — || March 1, 1992 || La Silla || UESAC || — || align=right | 3.3 km || 
|-id=234 bgcolor=#fefefe
| 29234 ||  || — || March 1, 1992 || La Silla || UESAC || — || align=right | 2.7 km || 
|-id=235 bgcolor=#fefefe
| 29235 ||  || — || March 2, 1992 || La Silla || UESAC || — || align=right | 4.7 km || 
|-id=236 bgcolor=#fefefe
| 29236 ||  || — || March 2, 1992 || La Silla || UESAC || MAS || align=right | 2.0 km || 
|-id=237 bgcolor=#fefefe
| 29237 ||  || — || March 2, 1992 || La Silla || UESAC || FLO || align=right | 2.5 km || 
|-id=238 bgcolor=#fefefe
| 29238 ||  || — || March 1, 1992 || La Silla || UESAC || NYS || align=right | 2.5 km || 
|-id=239 bgcolor=#fefefe
| 29239 ||  || — || March 2, 1992 || La Silla || UESAC || — || align=right | 2.2 km || 
|-id=240 bgcolor=#E9E9E9
| 29240 ||  || — || April 4, 1992 || La Silla || E. W. Elst || — || align=right | 3.6 km || 
|-id=241 bgcolor=#E9E9E9
| 29241 ||  || — || April 4, 1992 || La Silla || E. W. Elst || — || align=right | 4.8 km || 
|-id=242 bgcolor=#fefefe
| 29242 ||  || — || April 23, 1992 || La Silla || E. W. Elst || H || align=right | 2.7 km || 
|-id=243 bgcolor=#fefefe
| 29243 ||  || — || May 3, 1992 || Kitt Peak || Spacewatch || — || align=right | 3.9 km || 
|-id=244 bgcolor=#E9E9E9
| 29244 Van Damme ||  ||  || July 26, 1992 || La Silla || E. W. Elst || EUN || align=right | 7.1 km || 
|-id=245 bgcolor=#E9E9E9
| 29245 || 1992 PZ || — || August 8, 1992 || Caussols || E. W. Elst || — || align=right | 4.3 km || 
|-id=246 bgcolor=#E9E9E9
| 29246 Clausius || 1992 RV ||  || September 2, 1992 || Tautenburg Observatory || F. Börngen, L. D. Schmadel || — || align=right | 12 km || 
|-id=247 bgcolor=#E9E9E9
| 29247 ||  || — || September 2, 1992 || La Silla || E. W. Elst || — || align=right | 3.1 km || 
|-id=248 bgcolor=#E9E9E9
| 29248 ||  || — || September 27, 1992 || Kitt Peak || Spacewatch || — || align=right | 4.6 km || 
|-id=249 bgcolor=#E9E9E9
| 29249 Hiraizumi ||  ||  || September 26, 1992 || Geisei || T. Seki || AST || align=right | 7.7 km || 
|-id=250 bgcolor=#E9E9E9
| 29250 Helmutmoritz ||  ||  || September 24, 1992 || Tautenburg Observatory || L. D. Schmadel, F. Börngen || DOR || align=right | 8.8 km || 
|-id=251 bgcolor=#E9E9E9
| 29251 ||  || — || October 26, 1992 || Kitami || K. Endate, K. Watanabe || EUN || align=right | 7.6 km || 
|-id=252 bgcolor=#d6d6d6
| 29252 Konjikido ||  ||  || January 25, 1993 || Geisei || T. Seki || — || align=right | 9.4 km || 
|-id=253 bgcolor=#fefefe
| 29253 || 1993 DN || — || February 21, 1993 || Kushiro || S. Ueda, H. Kaneda || FLO || align=right | 2.6 km || 
|-id=254 bgcolor=#d6d6d6
| 29254 ||  || — || March 25, 1993 || Kushiro || S. Ueda, H. Kaneda || HYG || align=right | 15 km || 
|-id=255 bgcolor=#d6d6d6
| 29255 ||  || — || March 17, 1993 || La Silla || UESAC || — || align=right | 7.8 km || 
|-id=256 bgcolor=#fefefe
| 29256 ||  || — || March 17, 1993 || La Silla || UESAC || FLO || align=right | 2.4 km || 
|-id=257 bgcolor=#fefefe
| 29257 ||  || — || March 17, 1993 || La Silla || UESAC || V || align=right | 1.8 km || 
|-id=258 bgcolor=#fefefe
| 29258 ||  || — || March 17, 1993 || La Silla || UESAC || FLO || align=right | 1.6 km || 
|-id=259 bgcolor=#fefefe
| 29259 ||  || — || March 17, 1993 || La Silla || UESAC || FLO || align=right | 2.2 km || 
|-id=260 bgcolor=#d6d6d6
| 29260 ||  || — || March 17, 1993 || La Silla || UESAC || — || align=right | 8.1 km || 
|-id=261 bgcolor=#fefefe
| 29261 ||  || — || March 17, 1993 || La Silla || UESAC || FLO || align=right | 3.8 km || 
|-id=262 bgcolor=#fefefe
| 29262 ||  || — || March 17, 1993 || La Silla || UESAC || — || align=right | 3.1 km || 
|-id=263 bgcolor=#d6d6d6
| 29263 ||  || — || March 17, 1993 || La Silla || UESAC || EOS || align=right | 6.3 km || 
|-id=264 bgcolor=#fefefe
| 29264 ||  || — || March 17, 1993 || La Silla || UESAC || FLO || align=right | 1.4 km || 
|-id=265 bgcolor=#fefefe
| 29265 ||  || — || March 17, 1993 || La Silla || UESAC || — || align=right | 2.4 km || 
|-id=266 bgcolor=#d6d6d6
| 29266 ||  || — || March 17, 1993 || La Silla || UESAC || EMA || align=right | 6.4 km || 
|-id=267 bgcolor=#d6d6d6
| 29267 ||  || — || March 21, 1993 || La Silla || UESAC || — || align=right | 7.6 km || 
|-id=268 bgcolor=#d6d6d6
| 29268 ||  || — || March 21, 1993 || La Silla || UESAC || — || align=right | 6.0 km || 
|-id=269 bgcolor=#fefefe
| 29269 ||  || — || March 21, 1993 || La Silla || UESAC || V || align=right | 2.6 km || 
|-id=270 bgcolor=#fefefe
| 29270 ||  || — || March 21, 1993 || La Silla || UESAC || FLO || align=right | 2.3 km || 
|-id=271 bgcolor=#fefefe
| 29271 ||  || — || March 19, 1993 || La Silla || UESAC || NYS || align=right | 1.9 km || 
|-id=272 bgcolor=#fefefe
| 29272 ||  || — || March 19, 1993 || La Silla || UESAC || — || align=right | 1.4 km || 
|-id=273 bgcolor=#fefefe
| 29273 ||  || — || March 21, 1993 || La Silla || UESAC || — || align=right | 3.0 km || 
|-id=274 bgcolor=#d6d6d6
| 29274 ||  || — || March 19, 1993 || La Silla || UESAC || — || align=right | 7.6 km || 
|-id=275 bgcolor=#fefefe
| 29275 ||  || — || March 19, 1993 || La Silla || UESAC || — || align=right | 2.1 km || 
|-id=276 bgcolor=#fefefe
| 29276 ||  || — || March 19, 1993 || La Silla || UESAC || NYS || align=right | 1.7 km || 
|-id=277 bgcolor=#d6d6d6
| 29277 ||  || — || March 19, 1993 || La Silla || UESAC || — || align=right | 6.2 km || 
|-id=278 bgcolor=#d6d6d6
| 29278 ||  || — || March 17, 1993 || La Silla || UESAC || — || align=right | 6.9 km || 
|-id=279 bgcolor=#fefefe
| 29279 ||  || — || March 19, 1993 || La Silla || UESAC || — || align=right | 2.4 km || 
|-id=280 bgcolor=#fefefe
| 29280 ||  || — || March 19, 1993 || La Silla || UESAC || — || align=right | 2.9 km || 
|-id=281 bgcolor=#d6d6d6
| 29281 ||  || — || March 19, 1993 || La Silla || UESAC || VER || align=right | 9.8 km || 
|-id=282 bgcolor=#fefefe
| 29282 ||  || — || March 19, 1993 || La Silla || UESAC || V || align=right | 1.8 km || 
|-id=283 bgcolor=#fefefe
| 29283 ||  || — || March 19, 1993 || La Silla || UESAC || V || align=right | 1.5 km || 
|-id=284 bgcolor=#fefefe
| 29284 ||  || — || March 19, 1993 || La Silla || UESAC || — || align=right | 1.7 km || 
|-id=285 bgcolor=#d6d6d6
| 29285 ||  || — || March 19, 1993 || La Silla || UESAC || THM || align=right | 8.9 km || 
|-id=286 bgcolor=#fefefe
| 29286 ||  || — || March 19, 1993 || La Silla || UESAC || — || align=right | 2.1 km || 
|-id=287 bgcolor=#fefefe
| 29287 ||  || — || March 19, 1993 || La Silla || UESAC || NYS || align=right | 1.9 km || 
|-id=288 bgcolor=#fefefe
| 29288 ||  || — || March 19, 1993 || La Silla || UESAC || — || align=right | 2.9 km || 
|-id=289 bgcolor=#fefefe
| 29289 ||  || — || March 19, 1993 || La Silla || UESAC || — || align=right | 2.9 km || 
|-id=290 bgcolor=#fefefe
| 29290 ||  || — || March 24, 1993 || La Silla || UESAC || FLO || align=right | 1.6 km || 
|-id=291 bgcolor=#fefefe
| 29291 || 1993 JX || — || May 14, 1993 || La Silla || E. W. Elst || — || align=right | 2.5 km || 
|-id=292 bgcolor=#fefefe
| 29292 Conniewalker ||  ||  || May 24, 1993 || Palomar || C. S. Shoemaker, D. H. Levy || PHO || align=right | 4.6 km || 
|-id=293 bgcolor=#fefefe
| 29293 ||  || — || July 20, 1993 || La Silla || E. W. Elst || — || align=right | 5.3 km || 
|-id=294 bgcolor=#fefefe
| 29294 ||  || — || July 20, 1993 || La Silla || E. W. Elst || — || align=right | 2.5 km || 
|-id=295 bgcolor=#fefefe
| 29295 ||  || — || July 19, 1993 || La Silla || E. W. Elst || fast? || align=right | 2.0 km || 
|-id=296 bgcolor=#fefefe
| 29296 ||  || — || August 15, 1993 || Caussols || E. W. Elst || — || align=right | 4.9 km || 
|-id=297 bgcolor=#fefefe
| 29297 ||  || — || September 15, 1993 || La Silla || E. W. Elst || — || align=right | 3.3 km || 
|-id=298 bgcolor=#fefefe
| 29298 Cruls ||  ||  || September 16, 1993 || La Silla || H. Debehogne, E. W. Elst || H || align=right | 2.2 km || 
|-id=299 bgcolor=#E9E9E9
| 29299 ||  || — || October 15, 1993 || Kitami || K. Endate, K. Watanabe || — || align=right | 6.1 km || 
|-id=300 bgcolor=#E9E9E9
| 29300 ||  || — || October 9, 1993 || La Silla || E. W. Elst || — || align=right | 2.3 km || 
|}

29301–29400 

|-bgcolor=#E9E9E9
| 29301 ||  || — || October 9, 1993 || La Silla || E. W. Elst || — || align=right | 2.5 km || 
|-id=302 bgcolor=#E9E9E9
| 29302 ||  || — || October 9, 1993 || La Silla || E. W. Elst || — || align=right | 2.0 km || 
|-id=303 bgcolor=#E9E9E9
| 29303 ||  || — || October 11, 1993 || Palomar || H. E. Holt || GER || align=right | 8.0 km || 
|-id=304 bgcolor=#E9E9E9
| 29304 ||  || — || October 9, 1993 || La Silla || E. W. Elst || — || align=right | 2.0 km || 
|-id=305 bgcolor=#E9E9E9
| 29305 ||  || — || October 9, 1993 || La Silla || E. W. Elst || — || align=right | 3.8 km || 
|-id=306 bgcolor=#E9E9E9
| 29306 ||  || — || October 9, 1993 || La Silla || E. W. Elst || EUN || align=right | 4.8 km || 
|-id=307 bgcolor=#E9E9E9
| 29307 Torbernbergman ||  ||  || October 9, 1993 || La Silla || E. W. Elst || — || align=right | 7.1 km || 
|-id=308 bgcolor=#fefefe
| 29308 ||  || — || October 20, 1993 || Palomar || E. F. Helin || H || align=right | 2.3 km || 
|-id=309 bgcolor=#E9E9E9
| 29309 ||  || — || November 15, 1993 || Dynic || A. Sugie || — || align=right | 11 km || 
|-id=310 bgcolor=#E9E9E9
| 29310 ||  || — || November 15, 1993 || Kiyosato || S. Otomo || — || align=right | 4.4 km || 
|-id=311 bgcolor=#E9E9E9
| 29311 Lesire ||  ||  || January 16, 1994 || Caussols || E. W. Elst, C. Pollas || EUN || align=right | 9.3 km || 
|-id=312 bgcolor=#E9E9E9
| 29312 ||  || — || January 21, 1994 || Fujieda || H. Shiozawa, T. Urata || — || align=right | 3.9 km || 
|-id=313 bgcolor=#E9E9E9
| 29313 || 1994 CR || — || February 4, 1994 || Kushiro || S. Ueda, H. Kaneda || — || align=right | 4.3 km || 
|-id=314 bgcolor=#C2FFFF
| 29314 Eurydamas ||  ||  || February 8, 1994 || La Silla || E. W. Elst || L5moon || align=right | 21 km || 
|-id=315 bgcolor=#d6d6d6
| 29315 ||  || — || March 9, 1994 || Caussols || E. W. Elst || — || align=right | 7.6 km || 
|-id=316 bgcolor=#fefefe
| 29316 ||  || — || June 7, 1994 || Kitt Peak || Spacewatch || — || align=right | 2.1 km || 
|-id=317 bgcolor=#fefefe
| 29317 ||  || — || August 10, 1994 || La Silla || E. W. Elst || — || align=right | 4.1 km || 
|-id=318 bgcolor=#fefefe
| 29318 ||  || — || August 10, 1994 || La Silla || E. W. Elst || — || align=right | 2.5 km || 
|-id=319 bgcolor=#fefefe
| 29319 ||  || — || August 10, 1994 || La Silla || E. W. Elst || FLO || align=right | 2.0 km || 
|-id=320 bgcolor=#fefefe
| 29320 ||  || — || August 10, 1994 || La Silla || E. W. Elst || — || align=right | 2.2 km || 
|-id=321 bgcolor=#fefefe
| 29321 ||  || — || August 10, 1994 || La Silla || E. W. Elst || — || align=right | 1.8 km || 
|-id=322 bgcolor=#fefefe
| 29322 ||  || — || August 10, 1994 || La Silla || E. W. Elst || FLO || align=right | 1.2 km || 
|-id=323 bgcolor=#fefefe
| 29323 ||  || — || August 12, 1994 || La Silla || E. W. Elst || — || align=right | 1.8 km || 
|-id=324 bgcolor=#fefefe
| 29324 ||  || — || August 12, 1994 || La Silla || E. W. Elst || V || align=right | 2.4 km || 
|-id=325 bgcolor=#fefefe
| 29325 ||  || — || August 10, 1994 || La Silla || E. W. Elst || — || align=right | 1.7 km || 
|-id=326 bgcolor=#fefefe
| 29326 ||  || — || September 2, 1994 || Kitt Peak || Spacewatch || NYS || align=right | 1.6 km || 
|-id=327 bgcolor=#fefefe
| 29327 ||  || — || September 28, 1994 || Kitt Peak || Spacewatch || — || align=right | 3.0 km || 
|-id=328 bgcolor=#fefefe
| 29328 Hanshintigers ||  ||  || October 13, 1994 || Kiso || Kiso Obs. || FLO || align=right | 3.2 km || 
|-id=329 bgcolor=#fefefe
| 29329 Knobelsdorff ||  ||  || October 5, 1994 || Tautenburg Observatory || F. Börngen || FLO || align=right | 2.4 km || 
|-id=330 bgcolor=#fefefe
| 29330 || 1994 UK || — || October 31, 1994 || Oizumi || T. Kobayashi || MAS || align=right | 2.2 km || 
|-id=331 bgcolor=#fefefe
| 29331 ||  || — || October 28, 1994 || Kitt Peak || Spacewatch || — || align=right | 3.2 km || 
|-id=332 bgcolor=#fefefe
| 29332 || 1994 VE || — || November 1, 1994 || Oizumi || T. Kobayashi || — || align=right | 6.5 km || 
|-id=333 bgcolor=#fefefe
| 29333 ||  || — || November 8, 1994 || Oizumi || T. Kobayashi || — || align=right | 2.1 km || 
|-id=334 bgcolor=#fefefe
| 29334 || 1994 XJ || — || December 3, 1994 || Oizumi || T. Kobayashi || V || align=right | 2.9 km || 
|-id=335 bgcolor=#fefefe
| 29335 || 1994 XL || — || December 3, 1994 || Oizumi || T. Kobayashi || — || align=right | 3.0 km || 
|-id=336 bgcolor=#fefefe
| 29336 ||  || — || December 31, 1994 || Oizumi || T. Kobayashi || — || align=right | 6.3 km || 
|-id=337 bgcolor=#fefefe
| 29337 Hakurojo ||  ||  || January 6, 1995 || Geisei || T. Seki || — || align=right | 4.2 km || 
|-id=338 bgcolor=#fefefe
| 29338 ||  || — || January 2, 1995 || Kushiro || S. Ueda, H. Kaneda || — || align=right | 8.4 km || 
|-id=339 bgcolor=#fefefe
| 29339 || 1995 BA || — || January 19, 1995 || Oizumi || T. Kobayashi || EUT || align=right | 3.5 km || 
|-id=340 bgcolor=#E9E9E9
| 29340 || 1995 BF || — || January 23, 1995 || Oizumi || T. Kobayashi || — || align=right | 6.7 km || 
|-id=341 bgcolor=#E9E9E9
| 29341 ||  || — || January 25, 1995 || Oizumi || T. Kobayashi || — || align=right | 6.0 km || 
|-id=342 bgcolor=#E9E9E9
| 29342 ||  || — || February 3, 1995 || Nyukasa || M. Hirasawa, S. Suzuki || — || align=right | 4.0 km || 
|-id=343 bgcolor=#E9E9E9
| 29343 ||  || — || February 1, 1995 || Nachi-Katsuura || Y. Shimizu, T. Urata || EUN || align=right | 6.9 km || 
|-id=344 bgcolor=#E9E9E9
| 29344 || 1995 DX || — || February 20, 1995 || Oizumi || T. Kobayashi || ADE || align=right | 7.4 km || 
|-id=345 bgcolor=#E9E9E9
| 29345 Ivandanilov ||  ||  || February 22, 1995 || Zelenchukskaya || T. V. Kryachko || — || align=right | 6.1 km || 
|-id=346 bgcolor=#E9E9E9
| 29346 Mariadina ||  ||  || February 25, 1995 || Asiago || M. Tombelli || — || align=right | 6.0 km || 
|-id=347 bgcolor=#E9E9E9
| 29347 Natta || 1995 EU ||  || March 5, 1995 || Colleverde || V. S. Casulli || — || align=right | 4.5 km || 
|-id=348 bgcolor=#E9E9E9
| 29348 Criswick || 1995 FD ||  || March 28, 1995 || Climenhaga || D. D. Balam || — || align=right | 4.5 km || 
|-id=349 bgcolor=#E9E9E9
| 29349 ||  || — || March 23, 1995 || Kitt Peak || Spacewatch || — || align=right | 4.4 km || 
|-id=350 bgcolor=#E9E9E9
| 29350 ||  || — || March 31, 1995 || Kitt Peak || Spacewatch || — || align=right | 3.9 km || 
|-id=351 bgcolor=#E9E9E9
| 29351 ||  || — || April 25, 1995 || Kitt Peak || Spacewatch || MRX || align=right | 3.2 km || 
|-id=352 bgcolor=#E9E9E9
| 29352 || 1995 JR || — || May 1, 1995 || Kitt Peak || Spacewatch || — || align=right | 4.8 km || 
|-id=353 bgcolor=#d6d6d6
| 29353 Manu || 1995 OG ||  || July 19, 1995 || San Marcello || A. Boattini, L. Tesi || EOS || align=right | 5.5 km || 
|-id=354 bgcolor=#d6d6d6
| 29354 ||  || — || July 19, 1995 || Xinglong || SCAP || THM || align=right | 8.7 km || 
|-id=355 bgcolor=#d6d6d6
| 29355 Siratakayama ||  ||  || August 28, 1995 || Nanyo || T. Okuni || EOS || align=right | 5.6 km || 
|-id=356 bgcolor=#d6d6d6
| 29356 Giovarduino ||  ||  || September 25, 1995 || Pleiade || P. Antolini || THM || align=right | 9.0 km || 
|-id=357 bgcolor=#fefefe
| 29357 ||  || — || December 16, 1995 || Kitt Peak || Spacewatch || — || align=right | 1.4 km || 
|-id=358 bgcolor=#fefefe
| 29358 ||  || — || January 12, 1996 || Kitt Peak || Spacewatch || NYS || align=right | 2.2 km || 
|-id=359 bgcolor=#fefefe
| 29359 || 1996 BK || — || January 16, 1996 || Višnjan Observatory || Višnjan Obs. || — || align=right | 3.7 km || 
|-id=360 bgcolor=#fefefe
| 29360 ||  || — || January 18, 1996 || Kitt Peak || Spacewatch || FLO || align=right | 3.5 km || 
|-id=361 bgcolor=#fefefe
| 29361 Botticelli || 1996 CY ||  || February 9, 1996 || Colleverde || V. S. Casulli || FLO || align=right | 2.3 km || 
|-id=362 bgcolor=#fefefe
| 29362 Azumakofuzi ||  ||  || February 15, 1996 || Nanyo || T. Okuni || — || align=right | 3.2 km || 
|-id=363 bgcolor=#fefefe
| 29363 Ghigabartolini ||  ||  || February 14, 1996 || Cima Ekar || U. Munari, M. Tombelli || V || align=right | 3.2 km || 
|-id=364 bgcolor=#fefefe
| 29364 || 1996 DG || — || February 18, 1996 || Oizumi || T. Kobayashi || — || align=right | 2.8 km || 
|-id=365 bgcolor=#fefefe
| 29365 ||  || — || February 23, 1996 || Oizumi || T. Kobayashi || — || align=right | 3.2 km || 
|-id=366 bgcolor=#fefefe
| 29366 ||  || — || February 16, 1996 || Caussols || E. W. Elst || FLO || align=right | 3.8 km || 
|-id=367 bgcolor=#fefefe
| 29367 ||  || — || March 13, 1996 || Kitt Peak || Spacewatch || V || align=right | 1.8 km || 
|-id=368 bgcolor=#fefefe
| 29368 ||  || — || March 20, 1996 || Haleakala || NEAT || — || align=right | 2.3 km || 
|-id=369 bgcolor=#fefefe
| 29369 ||  || — || March 21, 1996 || Haleakala || NEAT || — || align=right | 2.3 km || 
|-id=370 bgcolor=#fefefe
| 29370 ||  || — || March 18, 1996 || Haleakala || NEAT || FLO || align=right | 2.6 km || 
|-id=371 bgcolor=#fefefe
| 29371 ||  || — || March 22, 1996 || La Silla || E. W. Elst || NYS || align=right | 1.9 km || 
|-id=372 bgcolor=#fefefe
| 29372 || 1996 GA || — || April 5, 1996 || Višnjan Observatory || Višnjan Obs. || — || align=right | 6.0 km || 
|-id=373 bgcolor=#fefefe
| 29373 Hamanowa ||  ||  || April 14, 1996 || Nanyo || T. Okuni || — || align=right | 3.4 km || 
|-id=374 bgcolor=#fefefe
| 29374 Kazumitsu ||  ||  || April 13, 1996 || Kitami || K. Endate, K. Watanabe || NYS || align=right | 2.3 km || 
|-id=375 bgcolor=#fefefe
| 29375 ||  || — || April 15, 1996 || La Silla || E. W. Elst || NYS || align=right | 2.1 km || 
|-id=376 bgcolor=#E9E9E9
| 29376 ||  || — || April 15, 1996 || La Silla || E. W. Elst || — || align=right | 3.6 km || 
|-id=377 bgcolor=#fefefe
| 29377 ||  || — || April 15, 1996 || La Silla || E. W. Elst || V || align=right | 2.8 km || 
|-id=378 bgcolor=#E9E9E9
| 29378 ||  || — || April 18, 1996 || Kitt Peak || Spacewatch || — || align=right | 3.9 km || 
|-id=379 bgcolor=#E9E9E9
| 29379 ||  || — || April 17, 1996 || La Silla || E. W. Elst || RAF || align=right | 3.7 km || 
|-id=380 bgcolor=#E9E9E9
| 29380 ||  || — || April 17, 1996 || La Silla || E. W. Elst || — || align=right | 3.1 km || 
|-id=381 bgcolor=#fefefe
| 29381 ||  || — || April 18, 1996 || La Silla || E. W. Elst || — || align=right | 3.2 km || 
|-id=382 bgcolor=#E9E9E9
| 29382 ||  || — || April 18, 1996 || La Silla || E. W. Elst || — || align=right | 3.3 km || 
|-id=383 bgcolor=#E9E9E9
| 29383 ||  || — || April 20, 1996 || La Silla || E. W. Elst || — || align=right | 2.9 km || 
|-id=384 bgcolor=#fefefe
| 29384 ||  || — || April 20, 1996 || La Silla || E. W. Elst || — || align=right | 2.7 km || 
|-id=385 bgcolor=#E9E9E9
| 29385 || 1996 JT || — || May 13, 1996 || Haleakala || NEAT || — || align=right | 2.8 km || 
|-id=386 bgcolor=#fefefe
| 29386 ||  || — || May 10, 1996 || Kitt Peak || Spacewatch || V || align=right | 3.5 km || 
|-id=387 bgcolor=#fefefe
| 29387 ||  || — || May 11, 1996 || Kitt Peak || Spacewatch || NYS || align=right | 2.8 km || 
|-id=388 bgcolor=#fefefe
| 29388 ||  || — || May 11, 1996 || Kitt Peak || Spacewatch || — || align=right | 3.2 km || 
|-id=389 bgcolor=#E9E9E9
| 29389 || 1996 LZ || — || June 13, 1996 || Haleakala || NEAT || — || align=right | 3.2 km || 
|-id=390 bgcolor=#fefefe
| 29390 ||  || — || June 11, 1996 || Kitt Peak || Spacewatch || V || align=right | 2.8 km || 
|-id=391 bgcolor=#E9E9E9
| 29391 Knight || 1996 MB ||  || June 17, 1996 || Needville || Needville Obs. || MIS || align=right | 6.9 km || 
|-id=392 bgcolor=#E9E9E9
| 29392 ||  || — || June 16, 1996 || Kitt Peak || Spacewatch || EUN || align=right | 4.1 km || 
|-id=393 bgcolor=#E9E9E9
| 29393 ||  || — || July 14, 1996 || La Silla || E. W. Elst || MAR || align=right | 4.7 km || 
|-id=394 bgcolor=#E9E9E9
| 29394 Hirokohamanowa ||  ||  || July 12, 1996 || Nanyo || T. Okuni || EUN || align=right | 4.9 km || 
|-id=395 bgcolor=#E9E9E9
| 29395 ||  || — || August 5, 1996 || Haleakala || AMOS || — || align=right | 3.9 km || 
|-id=396 bgcolor=#E9E9E9
| 29396 ||  || — || August 6, 1996 || Xinglong || SCAP || — || align=right | 6.4 km || 
|-id=397 bgcolor=#E9E9E9
| 29397 ||  || — || September 13, 1996 || Haleakala || NEAT || — || align=right | 4.4 km || 
|-id=398 bgcolor=#E9E9E9
| 29398 ||  || — || September 15, 1996 || Xinglong || SCAP || — || align=right | 6.2 km || 
|-id=399 bgcolor=#E9E9E9
| 29399 ||  || — || September 15, 1996 || Xinglong || SCAP || — || align=right | 4.8 km || 
|-id=400 bgcolor=#d6d6d6
| 29400 ||  || — || September 5, 1996 || Kitt Peak || Spacewatch || — || align=right | 6.1 km || 
|}

29401–29500 

|-bgcolor=#d6d6d6
| 29401 Asterix || 1996 TE ||  || October 1, 1996 || Kleť || M. Tichý, Z. Moravec || KOR || align=right | 3.5 km || 
|-id=402 bgcolor=#d6d6d6
| 29402 Obelix ||  ||  || October 14, 1996 || Kleť || M. Tichý, Z. Moravec || — || align=right | 7.4 km || 
|-id=403 bgcolor=#d6d6d6
| 29403 ||  || — || October 5, 1996 || Xinglong || SCAP || — || align=right | 5.7 km || 
|-id=404 bgcolor=#d6d6d6
| 29404 Hikarusato ||  ||  || October 9, 1996 || Nanyo || T. Okuni || KOR || align=right | 4.8 km || 
|-id=405 bgcolor=#d6d6d6
| 29405 ||  || — || October 4, 1996 || Kitt Peak || Spacewatch || — || align=right | 9.2 km || 
|-id=406 bgcolor=#E9E9E9
| 29406 ||  || — || October 10, 1996 || Kitt Peak || Spacewatch || EUN || align=right | 5.5 km || 
|-id=407 bgcolor=#FA8072
| 29407 || 1996 UW || — || October 20, 1996 || Oizumi || T. Kobayashi || — || align=right | 2.6 km || 
|-id=408 bgcolor=#d6d6d6
| 29408 ||  || — || November 3, 1996 || Kitami || K. Endate, K. Watanabe || — || align=right | 16 km || 
|-id=409 bgcolor=#d6d6d6
| 29409 ||  || — || November 14, 1996 || Oizumi || T. Kobayashi || — || align=right | 10 km || 
|-id=410 bgcolor=#d6d6d6
| 29410 ||  || — || November 15, 1996 || Oizumi || T. Kobayashi || HYG || align=right | 10 km || 
|-id=411 bgcolor=#d6d6d6
| 29411 ||  || — || November 20, 1996 || Xinglong || SCAP || — || align=right | 7.5 km || 
|-id=412 bgcolor=#d6d6d6
| 29412 ||  || — || November 27, 1996 || Xinglong || SCAP || — || align=right | 11 km || 
|-id=413 bgcolor=#d6d6d6
| 29413 ||  || — || December 2, 1996 || Oizumi || T. Kobayashi || — || align=right | 8.1 km || 
|-id=414 bgcolor=#d6d6d6
| 29414 ||  || — || December 2, 1996 || Oizumi || T. Kobayashi || HYG || align=right | 6.9 km || 
|-id=415 bgcolor=#d6d6d6
| 29415 ||  || — || December 7, 1996 || Oizumi || T. Kobayashi || — || align=right | 7.5 km || 
|-id=416 bgcolor=#d6d6d6
| 29416 ||  || — || December 7, 1996 || Oizumi || T. Kobayashi || — || align=right | 6.9 km || 
|-id=417 bgcolor=#E9E9E9
| 29417 ||  || — || December 6, 1996 || Xinglong || SCAP || — || align=right | 12 km || 
|-id=418 bgcolor=#d6d6d6
| 29418 ||  || — || January 11, 1997 || Oizumi || T. Kobayashi || — || align=right | 12 km || 
|-id=419 bgcolor=#d6d6d6
| 29419 Mládková ||  ||  || January 13, 1997 || Ondřejov || L. Kotková || 7:4 || align=right | 7.0 km || 
|-id=420 bgcolor=#d6d6d6
| 29420 Ikuo ||  ||  || January 9, 1997 || Chichibu || N. Satō || — || align=right | 12 km || 
|-id=421 bgcolor=#fefefe
| 29421 ||  || — || January 9, 1997 || Chichibu || N. Satō || H || align=right | 1.6 km || 
|-id=422 bgcolor=#d6d6d6
| 29422 ||  || — || January 9, 1997 || Kushiro || S. Ueda, H. Kaneda || TIR || align=right | 8.1 km || 
|-id=423 bgcolor=#d6d6d6
| 29423 ||  || — || January 9, 1997 || Kushiro || S. Ueda, H. Kaneda || — || align=right | 17 km || 
|-id=424 bgcolor=#d6d6d6
| 29424 ||  || — || January 29, 1997 || Sormano || A. Testa, P. Chiavenna || — || align=right | 11 km || 
|-id=425 bgcolor=#fefefe
| 29425 ||  || — || February 13, 1997 || Oizumi || T. Kobayashi || — || align=right | 1.9 km || 
|-id=426 bgcolor=#d6d6d6
| 29426 ||  || — || February 11, 1997 || Xinglong || SCAP || — || align=right | 17 km || 
|-id=427 bgcolor=#fefefe
| 29427 Oswaldthomas ||  ||  || March 7, 1997 || Linz || E. Meyer || — || align=right | 1.4 km || 
|-id=428 bgcolor=#fefefe
| 29428 Ettoremajorana ||  ||  || March 31, 1997 || Colleverde || V. S. Casulli || H || align=right | 2.4 km || 
|-id=429 bgcolor=#fefefe
| 29429 ||  || — || April 3, 1997 || Socorro || LINEAR || — || align=right | 1.6 km || 
|-id=430 bgcolor=#fefefe
| 29430 Mimiyen ||  ||  || April 6, 1997 || Socorro || LINEAR || V || align=right | 1.4 km || 
|-id=431 bgcolor=#fefefe
| 29431 Shijimi ||  ||  || April 12, 1997 || Yatsuka || H. Abe || — || align=right | 3.2 km || 
|-id=432 bgcolor=#d6d6d6
| 29432 Williamscott ||  ||  || April 3, 1997 || Socorro || LINEAR || — || align=right | 6.8 km || 
|-id=433 bgcolor=#d6d6d6
| 29433 ||  || — || April 30, 1997 || Kitt Peak || Spacewatch || 3:2 || align=right | 14 km || 
|-id=434 bgcolor=#fefefe
| 29434 ||  || — || April 30, 1997 || Socorro || LINEAR || — || align=right | 1.5 km || 
|-id=435 bgcolor=#fefefe
| 29435 Mordell ||  ||  || May 8, 1997 || Prescott || P. G. Comba || FLO || align=right | 1.9 km || 
|-id=436 bgcolor=#fefefe
| 29436 ||  || — || May 3, 1997 || La Silla || E. W. Elst || — || align=right | 2.8 km || 
|-id=437 bgcolor=#fefefe
| 29437 Marchais ||  ||  || June 7, 1997 || Castres || A. Klotz || KLI || align=right | 4.5 km || 
|-id=438 bgcolor=#fefefe
| 29438 Zhengjia || 1997 MV ||  || June 26, 1997 || Xinglong || SCAP || — || align=right | 1.8 km || 
|-id=439 bgcolor=#fefefe
| 29439 Maxfabiani ||  ||  || June 28, 1997 || Farra d'Isonzo || Farra d'Isonzo || — || align=right | 2.3 km || 
|-id=440 bgcolor=#fefefe
| 29440 ||  || — || June 28, 1997 || Socorro || LINEAR || FLO || align=right | 2.5 km || 
|-id=441 bgcolor=#fefefe
| 29441 ||  || — || July 2, 1997 || Kitt Peak || Spacewatch || — || align=right | 2.1 km || 
|-id=442 bgcolor=#fefefe
| 29442 ||  || — || July 8, 1997 || Caussols || ODAS || — || align=right | 2.9 km || 
|-id=443 bgcolor=#fefefe
| 29443 Remocorti ||  ||  || July 13, 1997 || San Marcello || L. Tesi, G. Cattani || — || align=right | 2.6 km || 
|-id=444 bgcolor=#fefefe
| 29444 ||  || — || July 6, 1997 || Moriyama || Y. Ikari || ERI || align=right | 3.7 km || 
|-id=445 bgcolor=#fefefe
| 29445 || 1997 PH || — || August 1, 1997 || Haleakala || NEAT || V || align=right | 3.5 km || 
|-id=446 bgcolor=#fefefe
| 29446 Gouguenheim || 1997 PX ||  || August 4, 1997 || Caussols || ODAS || — || align=right | 2.0 km || 
|-id=447 bgcolor=#fefefe
| 29447 Jerzyneyman ||  ||  || August 12, 1997 || Prescott || P. G. Comba || — || align=right | 2.3 km || 
|-id=448 bgcolor=#fefefe
| 29448 Pappos || 1997 QJ ||  || August 23, 1997 || Prescott || P. G. Comba || — || align=right | 2.1 km || 
|-id=449 bgcolor=#E9E9E9
| 29449 Taharbenjelloun ||  ||  || August 29, 1997 || Colleverde || V. S. Casulli || EUN || align=right | 3.2 km || 
|-id=450 bgcolor=#fefefe
| 29450 Tomohiroohno ||  ||  || August 28, 1997 || Nanyo || T. Okuni || FLO || align=right | 5.3 km || 
|-id=451 bgcolor=#FA8072
| 29451 ||  || — || September 2, 1997 || Haleakala || NEAT || — || align=right | 3.4 km || 
|-id=452 bgcolor=#fefefe
| 29452 ||  || — || September 3, 1997 || Majorca || Á. López J., R. Pacheco || — || align=right | 5.8 km || 
|-id=453 bgcolor=#fefefe
| 29453 ||  || — || September 5, 1997 || Majorca || Á. López J., R. Pacheco || — || align=right | 2.9 km || 
|-id=454 bgcolor=#fefefe
| 29454 ||  || — || September 9, 1997 || Rand || G. R. Viscome || — || align=right | 2.8 km || 
|-id=455 bgcolor=#E9E9E9
| 29455 ||  || — || September 23, 1997 || Ondřejov || P. Pravec, M. Wolf || — || align=right | 7.3 km || 
|-id=456 bgcolor=#fefefe
| 29456 Evakrchová ||  ||  || September 24, 1997 || Ondřejov || L. Kotková || NYS || align=right | 4.5 km || 
|-id=457 bgcolor=#fefefe
| 29457 Marcopolo ||  ||  || September 25, 1997 || Pianoro || V. Goretti || NYS || align=right | 2.4 km || 
|-id=458 bgcolor=#fefefe
| 29458 Pearson ||  ||  || September 30, 1997 || Prescott || P. G. Comba || NYS || align=right | 1.9 km || 
|-id=459 bgcolor=#fefefe
| 29459 ||  || — || September 29, 1997 || Xinglong || SCAP || — || align=right | 2.7 km || 
|-id=460 bgcolor=#fefefe
| 29460 ||  || — || September 30, 1997 || Kitt Peak || Spacewatch || — || align=right | 4.0 km || 
|-id=461 bgcolor=#fefefe
| 29461 ||  || — || September 30, 1997 || Xinglong || SCAP || NYS || align=right | 2.0 km || 
|-id=462 bgcolor=#E9E9E9
| 29462 ||  || — || September 29, 1997 || Caussols || ODAS || — || align=right | 3.6 km || 
|-id=463 bgcolor=#E9E9E9
| 29463 Benjaminpeirce || 1997 TB ||  || October 2, 1997 || Prescott || P. G. Comba || MAR || align=right | 2.8 km || 
|-id=464 bgcolor=#E9E9E9
| 29464 Leonmiš ||  ||  || October 5, 1997 || Ondřejov || P. Pravec || — || align=right | 2.0 km || 
|-id=465 bgcolor=#E9E9E9
| 29465 ||  || — || October 3, 1997 || Kitt Peak || Spacewatch || KON || align=right | 5.2 km || 
|-id=466 bgcolor=#E9E9E9
| 29466 ||  || — || October 8, 1997 || Oizumi || T. Kobayashi || — || align=right | 5.0 km || 
|-id=467 bgcolor=#E9E9E9
| 29467 Shandongdaxue ||  ||  || October 15, 1997 || Xinglong || SCAP || GEF || align=right | 4.1 km || 
|-id=468 bgcolor=#fefefe
| 29468 || 1997 UC || — || October 20, 1997 || Oohira || T. Urata || — || align=right | 3.4 km || 
|-id=469 bgcolor=#E9E9E9
| 29469 ||  || — || October 25, 1997 || Oohira || T. Urata || — || align=right | 4.8 km || 
|-id=470 bgcolor=#E9E9E9
| 29470 Higgs ||  ||  || October 26, 1997 || Colleverde || V. S. Casulli || — || align=right | 7.1 km || 
|-id=471 bgcolor=#fefefe
| 29471 Spejbl ||  ||  || October 27, 1997 || Ondřejov || L. Kotková || — || align=right | 3.0 km || 
|-id=472 bgcolor=#E9E9E9
| 29472 Hurvínek ||  ||  || October 27, 1997 || Ondřejov || L. Kotková || — || align=right | 3.8 km || 
|-id=473 bgcolor=#E9E9E9
| 29473 Krejčí ||  ||  || October 21, 1997 || Ondřejov || P. Pravec, L. Kotková || — || align=right | 4.9 km || 
|-id=474 bgcolor=#E9E9E9
| 29474 ||  || — || October 25, 1997 || Kitami || K. Endate, K. Watanabe || — || align=right | 3.7 km || 
|-id=475 bgcolor=#fefefe
| 29475 ||  || — || October 29, 1997 || Haleakala || NEAT || PHO || align=right | 9.2 km || 
|-id=476 bgcolor=#E9E9E9
| 29476 Kvíčala ||  ||  || October 31, 1997 || Ondřejov || P. Pravec || — || align=right | 3.4 km || 
|-id=477 bgcolor=#E9E9E9
| 29477 Zdíkšíma ||  ||  || October 31, 1997 || Kleť || J. Tichá, M. Tichý || — || align=right | 2.8 km || 
|-id=478 bgcolor=#E9E9E9
| 29478 ||  || — || October 28, 1997 || Kitt Peak || Spacewatch || — || align=right | 4.5 km || 
|-id=479 bgcolor=#E9E9E9
| 29479 ||  || — || November 1, 1997 || Oohira || T. Urata || MAR || align=right | 4.6 km || 
|-id=480 bgcolor=#E9E9E9
| 29480 ||  || — || November 1, 1997 || Kushiro || S. Ueda, H. Kaneda || — || align=right | 4.7 km || 
|-id=481 bgcolor=#E9E9E9
| 29481 ||  || — || November 6, 1997 || Oizumi || T. Kobayashi || — || align=right | 5.7 km || 
|-id=482 bgcolor=#E9E9E9
| 29482 ||  || — || November 6, 1997 || Oizumi || T. Kobayashi || — || align=right | 14 km || 
|-id=483 bgcolor=#fefefe
| 29483 Boeker ||  ||  || November 3, 1997 || Solingen || B. Koch || — || align=right | 1.9 km || 
|-id=484 bgcolor=#E9E9E9
| 29484 Honzaveselý ||  ||  || November 9, 1997 || Ondřejov || L. Kotková || — || align=right | 3.2 km || 
|-id=485 bgcolor=#fefefe
| 29485 ||  || — || November 2, 1997 || Xinglong || SCAP || — || align=right | 2.9 km || 
|-id=486 bgcolor=#E9E9E9
| 29486 ||  || — || November 2, 1997 || Xinglong || SCAP || — || align=right | 2.1 km || 
|-id=487 bgcolor=#E9E9E9
| 29487 ||  || — || November 14, 1997 || Xinglong || SCAP || EUN || align=right | 5.6 km || 
|-id=488 bgcolor=#E9E9E9
| 29488 || 1997 WM || — || November 18, 1997 || Oizumi || T. Kobayashi || — || align=right | 4.9 km || 
|-id=489 bgcolor=#E9E9E9
| 29489 || 1997 WQ || — || November 18, 1997 || Oizumi || T. Kobayashi || EUN || align=right | 6.2 km || 
|-id=490 bgcolor=#fefefe
| 29490 Myslbek || 1997 WX ||  || November 19, 1997 || Ondřejov || P. Pravec || — || align=right | 3.2 km || 
|-id=491 bgcolor=#E9E9E9
| 29491 Pfaff ||  ||  || November 23, 1997 || Prescott || P. G. Comba || — || align=right | 3.9 km || 
|-id=492 bgcolor=#E9E9E9
| 29492 ||  || — || November 23, 1997 || Oizumi || T. Kobayashi || — || align=right | 16 km || 
|-id=493 bgcolor=#E9E9E9
| 29493 ||  || — || November 23, 1997 || Kitt Peak || Spacewatch || — || align=right | 3.3 km || 
|-id=494 bgcolor=#E9E9E9
| 29494 ||  || — || November 19, 1997 || Nachi-Katsuura || Y. Shimizu, T. Urata || — || align=right | 11 km || 
|-id=495 bgcolor=#E9E9E9
| 29495 ||  || — || November 27, 1997 || Woomera || F. B. Zoltowski || — || align=right | 11 km || 
|-id=496 bgcolor=#E9E9E9
| 29496 ||  || — || November 19, 1997 || Nachi-Katsuura || Y. Shimizu, T. Urata || — || align=right | 5.6 km || 
|-id=497 bgcolor=#E9E9E9
| 29497 ||  || — || November 23, 1997 || Kitt Peak || Spacewatch || — || align=right | 6.3 km || 
|-id=498 bgcolor=#E9E9E9
| 29498 ||  || — || November 30, 1997 || Oizumi || T. Kobayashi || — || align=right | 9.4 km || 
|-id=499 bgcolor=#d6d6d6
| 29499 ||  || — || November 30, 1997 || Oizumi || T. Kobayashi || KOR || align=right | 4.0 km || 
|-id=500 bgcolor=#d6d6d6
| 29500 ||  || — || November 29, 1997 || Socorro || LINEAR || THM || align=right | 8.9 km || 
|}

29501–29600 

|-bgcolor=#E9E9E9
| 29501 ||  || — || November 29, 1997 || Socorro || LINEAR || — || align=right | 2.8 km || 
|-id=502 bgcolor=#E9E9E9
| 29502 ||  || — || November 29, 1997 || Socorro || LINEAR || — || align=right | 3.4 km || 
|-id=503 bgcolor=#E9E9E9
| 29503 ||  || — || November 29, 1997 || Socorro || LINEAR || BRG || align=right | 5.7 km || 
|-id=504 bgcolor=#E9E9E9
| 29504 ||  || — || November 29, 1997 || Socorro || LINEAR || — || align=right | 4.1 km || 
|-id=505 bgcolor=#E9E9E9
| 29505 ||  || — || November 29, 1997 || Socorro || LINEAR || DOR || align=right | 9.2 km || 
|-id=506 bgcolor=#E9E9E9
| 29506 || 1997 XM || — || December 3, 1997 || Oizumi || T. Kobayashi || — || align=right | 4.0 km || 
|-id=507 bgcolor=#d6d6d6
| 29507 || 1997 XV || — || December 3, 1997 || Oizumi || T. Kobayashi || — || align=right | 4.9 km || 
|-id=508 bgcolor=#d6d6d6
| 29508 Bottinelli ||  ||  || December 7, 1997 || Caussols || ODAS || THM || align=right | 7.0 km || 
|-id=509 bgcolor=#d6d6d6
| 29509 ||  || — || December 17, 1997 || Xinglong || SCAP || EOS || align=right | 5.7 km || 
|-id=510 bgcolor=#d6d6d6
| 29510 ||  || — || December 21, 1997 || Oizumi || T. Kobayashi || EOS || align=right | 6.7 km || 
|-id=511 bgcolor=#d6d6d6
| 29511 ||  || — || December 21, 1997 || Xinglong || SCAP || — || align=right | 3.6 km || 
|-id=512 bgcolor=#E9E9E9
| 29512 ||  || — || December 25, 1997 || Oizumi || T. Kobayashi || — || align=right | 5.4 km || 
|-id=513 bgcolor=#d6d6d6
| 29513 ||  || — || December 25, 1997 || Oizumi || T. Kobayashi || EOS || align=right | 9.0 km || 
|-id=514 bgcolor=#d6d6d6
| 29514 Karatsu ||  ||  || December 25, 1997 || Chichibu || N. Satō || — || align=right | 10 km || 
|-id=515 bgcolor=#E9E9E9
| 29515 ||  || — || December 27, 1997 || Oizumi || T. Kobayashi || — || align=right | 7.8 km || 
|-id=516 bgcolor=#d6d6d6
| 29516 ||  || — || December 27, 1997 || Oizumi || T. Kobayashi || EOS || align=right | 6.4 km || 
|-id=517 bgcolor=#d6d6d6
| 29517 ||  || — || December 30, 1997 || Oizumi || T. Kobayashi || — || align=right | 15 km || 
|-id=518 bgcolor=#E9E9E9
| 29518 ||  || — || December 31, 1997 || Lime Creek || T. Houlden, E. Ross || AGN || align=right | 4.9 km || 
|-id=519 bgcolor=#d6d6d6
| 29519 ||  || — || December 29, 1997 || Kitt Peak || Spacewatch || — || align=right | 8.9 km || 
|-id=520 bgcolor=#d6d6d6
| 29520 ||  || — || December 31, 1997 || Oizumi || T. Kobayashi || KOR || align=right | 3.9 km || 
|-id=521 bgcolor=#d6d6d6
| 29521 ||  || — || December 31, 1997 || Oizumi || T. Kobayashi || — || align=right | 12 km || 
|-id=522 bgcolor=#d6d6d6
| 29522 ||  || — || December 29, 1997 || Kitt Peak || Spacewatch || THM || align=right | 6.3 km || 
|-id=523 bgcolor=#E9E9E9
| 29523 ||  || — || December 29, 1997 || Kitt Peak || Spacewatch || AGN || align=right | 2.9 km || 
|-id=524 bgcolor=#d6d6d6
| 29524 || 1998 AE || — || January 3, 1998 || Oaxaca || J. M. Roe || 2:1J || align=right | 12 km || 
|-id=525 bgcolor=#fefefe
| 29525 || 1998 AF || — || January 2, 1998 || Moriyama || Y. Ikari || FLO || align=right | 3.0 km || 
|-id=526 bgcolor=#d6d6d6
| 29526 || 1998 AV || — || January 5, 1998 || Oizumi || T. Kobayashi || — || align=right | 13 km || 
|-id=527 bgcolor=#d6d6d6
| 29527 ||  || — || January 5, 1998 || Xinglong || SCAP || — || align=right | 8.3 km || 
|-id=528 bgcolor=#E9E9E9
| 29528 Kaplinski ||  ||  || January 10, 1998 || Ondřejov || L. Kotková || — || align=right | 4.5 km || 
|-id=529 bgcolor=#d6d6d6
| 29529 || 1998 BM || — || January 18, 1998 || Oizumi || T. Kobayashi || — || align=right | 13 km || 
|-id=530 bgcolor=#d6d6d6
| 29530 || 1998 BT || — || January 19, 1998 || Oizumi || T. Kobayashi || EOS || align=right | 5.4 km || 
|-id=531 bgcolor=#d6d6d6
| 29531 ||  || — || January 19, 1998 || Oizumi || T. Kobayashi || — || align=right | 8.3 km || 
|-id=532 bgcolor=#d6d6d6
| 29532 ||  || — || January 19, 1998 || Oizumi || T. Kobayashi || — || align=right | 4.5 km || 
|-id=533 bgcolor=#d6d6d6
| 29533 ||  || — || January 19, 1998 || Les Tardieux Obs. || M. Boeuf || — || align=right | 8.4 km || 
|-id=534 bgcolor=#d6d6d6
| 29534 ||  || — || January 24, 1998 || Haleakala || NEAT || — || align=right | 7.5 km || 
|-id=535 bgcolor=#d6d6d6
| 29535 ||  || — || January 25, 1998 || Oizumi || T. Kobayashi || EOS || align=right | 5.7 km || 
|-id=536 bgcolor=#d6d6d6
| 29536 ||  || — || January 23, 1998 || Socorro || LINEAR || — || align=right | 9.6 km || 
|-id=537 bgcolor=#d6d6d6
| 29537 ||  || — || January 24, 1998 || Haleakala || NEAT || VER || align=right | 6.8 km || 
|-id=538 bgcolor=#d6d6d6
| 29538 ||  || — || January 25, 1998 || Haleakala || NEAT || 7:4 || align=right | 22 km || 
|-id=539 bgcolor=#d6d6d6
| 29539 ||  || — || January 26, 1998 || Kitt Peak || Spacewatch || THM || align=right | 8.7 km || 
|-id=540 bgcolor=#d6d6d6
| 29540 ||  || — || January 28, 1998 || Oizumi || T. Kobayashi || HYG || align=right | 12 km || 
|-id=541 bgcolor=#d6d6d6
| 29541 ||  || — || January 28, 1998 || Oizumi || T. Kobayashi || — || align=right | 7.2 km || 
|-id=542 bgcolor=#d6d6d6
| 29542 ||  || — || January 29, 1998 || Oizumi || T. Kobayashi || EOS || align=right | 6.0 km || 
|-id=543 bgcolor=#E9E9E9
| 29543 ||  || — || January 29, 1998 || Kitt Peak || Spacewatch || — || align=right | 4.4 km || 
|-id=544 bgcolor=#d6d6d6
| 29544 ||  || — || January 30, 1998 || Oizumi || T. Kobayashi || EOS || align=right | 7.3 km || 
|-id=545 bgcolor=#d6d6d6
| 29545 ||  || — || January 26, 1998 || Kitt Peak || Spacewatch || THM || align=right | 10 km || 
|-id=546 bgcolor=#d6d6d6
| 29546 ||  || — || January 31, 1998 || Oizumi || T. Kobayashi || — || align=right | 15 km || 
|-id=547 bgcolor=#d6d6d6
| 29547 Yurimazzanti ||  ||  || January 25, 1998 || Cima Ekar || M. Tombelli, U. Munari || — || align=right | 8.2 km || 
|-id=548 bgcolor=#d6d6d6
| 29548 ||  || — || January 19, 1998 || Xinglong || SCAP || CRO || align=right | 8.2 km || 
|-id=549 bgcolor=#E9E9E9
| 29549 Sandrasbaragli ||  ||  || January 25, 1998 || Cima Ekar || M. Tombelli, A. Boattini || — || align=right | 4.9 km || 
|-id=550 bgcolor=#E9E9E9
| 29550 Yaribartolini ||  ||  || January 25, 1998 || Cima Ekar || M. Tombelli, G. Forti || EUN || align=right | 5.0 km || 
|-id=551 bgcolor=#d6d6d6
| 29551 ||  || — || February 5, 1998 || Xinglong || SCAP || KORfast? || align=right | 4.1 km || 
|-id=552 bgcolor=#d6d6d6
| 29552 Chern ||  ||  || February 15, 1998 || Xinglong || SCAP || CHA || align=right | 8.4 km || 
|-id=553 bgcolor=#d6d6d6
| 29553 ||  || — || February 6, 1998 || La Silla || E. W. Elst || — || align=right | 7.6 km || 
|-id=554 bgcolor=#d6d6d6
| 29554 ||  || — || February 6, 1998 || La Silla || E. W. Elst || EOS || align=right | 6.1 km || 
|-id=555 bgcolor=#d6d6d6
| 29555 MACEK || 1998 DP ||  || February 18, 1998 || Kleť || M. Tichý, Z. Moravec || — || align=right | 23 km || 
|-id=556 bgcolor=#d6d6d6
| 29556 ||  || — || February 21, 1998 || Oizumi || T. Kobayashi || EOS || align=right | 9.5 km || 
|-id=557 bgcolor=#d6d6d6
| 29557 ||  || — || February 22, 1998 || Haleakala || NEAT || THM || align=right | 8.8 km || 
|-id=558 bgcolor=#E9E9E9
| 29558 ||  || — || February 22, 1998 || Haleakala || NEAT || — || align=right | 4.2 km || 
|-id=559 bgcolor=#d6d6d6
| 29559 ||  || — || February 22, 1998 || Haleakala || NEAT || — || align=right | 9.7 km || 
|-id=560 bgcolor=#d6d6d6
| 29560 ||  || — || February 22, 1998 || Haleakala || NEAT || — || align=right | 13 km || 
|-id=561 bgcolor=#d6d6d6
| 29561 Iatteri ||  ||  || February 21, 1998 || Stroncone || Santa Lucia Obs. || — || align=right | 12 km || 
|-id=562 bgcolor=#d6d6d6
| 29562 Danmacdonald ||  ||  || February 22, 1998 || Haleakala || NEAT || EOS || align=right | 7.7 km || 
|-id=563 bgcolor=#d6d6d6
| 29563 ||  || — || February 24, 1998 || Kitt Peak || Spacewatch || EOS || align=right | 6.7 km || 
|-id=564 bgcolor=#d6d6d6
| 29564 ||  || — || March 2, 1998 || Nachi-Katsuura || Y. Shimizu, T. Urata || — || align=right | 27 km || 
|-id=565 bgcolor=#d6d6d6
| 29565 Glenngould || 1998 FD ||  || March 17, 1998 || Les Tardieux Obs. || M. Boeuf || — || align=right | 8.6 km || 
|-id=566 bgcolor=#FA8072
| 29566 ||  || — || March 24, 1998 || Socorro || LINEAR || — || align=right | 1.8 km || 
|-id=567 bgcolor=#d6d6d6
| 29567 ||  || — || March 26, 1998 || Haleakala || NEAT || EOS || align=right | 10 km || 
|-id=568 bgcolor=#d6d6d6
| 29568 Gobbi-Belcredi ||  ||  || March 25, 1998 || Bologna || San Vittore Obs. || KOR || align=right | 4.6 km || 
|-id=569 bgcolor=#d6d6d6
| 29569 ||  || — || March 20, 1998 || Socorro || LINEAR || — || align=right | 5.6 km || 
|-id=570 bgcolor=#d6d6d6
| 29570 ||  || — || March 20, 1998 || Socorro || LINEAR || — || align=right | 7.2 km || 
|-id=571 bgcolor=#d6d6d6
| 29571 ||  || — || March 20, 1998 || Socorro || LINEAR || — || align=right | 13 km || 
|-id=572 bgcolor=#d6d6d6
| 29572 ||  || — || March 20, 1998 || Socorro || LINEAR || EOS || align=right | 5.6 km || 
|-id=573 bgcolor=#d6d6d6
| 29573 ||  || — || March 20, 1998 || Socorro || LINEAR || HYG || align=right | 9.3 km || 
|-id=574 bgcolor=#d6d6d6
| 29574 ||  || — || March 20, 1998 || Socorro || LINEAR || 3:2 || align=right | 15 km || 
|-id=575 bgcolor=#d6d6d6
| 29575 Gundlapalli ||  ||  || March 20, 1998 || Socorro || LINEAR || HYG || align=right | 6.2 km || 
|-id=576 bgcolor=#d6d6d6
| 29576 ||  || — || March 20, 1998 || Socorro || LINEAR || — || align=right | 9.9 km || 
|-id=577 bgcolor=#d6d6d6
| 29577 ||  || — || March 20, 1998 || Socorro || LINEAR || HYG || align=right | 12 km || 
|-id=578 bgcolor=#d6d6d6
| 29578 ||  || — || March 20, 1998 || Socorro || LINEAR || — || align=right | 12 km || 
|-id=579 bgcolor=#d6d6d6
| 29579 ||  || — || March 20, 1998 || Socorro || LINEAR || AEG || align=right | 10 km || 
|-id=580 bgcolor=#d6d6d6
| 29580 ||  || — || March 20, 1998 || Socorro || LINEAR || — || align=right | 11 km || 
|-id=581 bgcolor=#d6d6d6
| 29581 ||  || — || March 20, 1998 || Socorro || LINEAR || — || align=right | 8.8 km || 
|-id=582 bgcolor=#d6d6d6
| 29582 ||  || — || March 20, 1998 || Socorro || LINEAR || — || align=right | 13 km || 
|-id=583 bgcolor=#d6d6d6
| 29583 ||  || — || March 20, 1998 || Socorro || LINEAR || THM || align=right | 9.6 km || 
|-id=584 bgcolor=#d6d6d6
| 29584 ||  || — || March 20, 1998 || Socorro || LINEAR || THM || align=right | 9.6 km || 
|-id=585 bgcolor=#d6d6d6
| 29585 Johnhale ||  ||  || March 20, 1998 || Socorro || LINEAR || — || align=right | 8.1 km || 
|-id=586 bgcolor=#d6d6d6
| 29586 ||  || — || March 20, 1998 || Socorro || LINEAR || HYG || align=right | 8.7 km || 
|-id=587 bgcolor=#d6d6d6
| 29587 ||  || — || March 20, 1998 || Socorro || LINEAR || — || align=right | 9.6 km || 
|-id=588 bgcolor=#d6d6d6
| 29588 ||  || — || March 20, 1998 || Socorro || LINEAR || — || align=right | 16 km || 
|-id=589 bgcolor=#d6d6d6
| 29589 ||  || — || March 31, 1998 || Socorro || LINEAR || — || align=right | 6.0 km || 
|-id=590 bgcolor=#d6d6d6
| 29590 ||  || — || March 31, 1998 || Socorro || LINEAR || — || align=right | 6.0 km || 
|-id=591 bgcolor=#d6d6d6
| 29591 ||  || — || March 20, 1998 || Socorro || LINEAR || 3:2 || align=right | 14 km || 
|-id=592 bgcolor=#d6d6d6
| 29592 ||  || — || March 20, 1998 || Socorro || LINEAR || — || align=right | 9.0 km || 
|-id=593 bgcolor=#d6d6d6
| 29593 ||  || — || March 22, 1998 || Socorro || LINEAR || — || align=right | 13 km || 
|-id=594 bgcolor=#d6d6d6
| 29594 ||  || — || April 2, 1998 || Socorro || LINEAR || Tj (2.99) || align=right | 13 km || 
|-id=595 bgcolor=#d6d6d6
| 29595 ||  || — || April 26, 1998 || Haleakala || NEAT || ALA || align=right | 21 km || 
|-id=596 bgcolor=#d6d6d6
| 29596 ||  || — || April 20, 1998 || Socorro || LINEAR || — || align=right | 9.1 km || 
|-id=597 bgcolor=#d6d6d6
| 29597 ||  || — || April 20, 1998 || Socorro || LINEAR || — || align=right | 14 km || 
|-id=598 bgcolor=#d6d6d6
| 29598 ||  || — || April 21, 1998 || Socorro || LINEAR || — || align=right | 8.6 km || 
|-id=599 bgcolor=#d6d6d6
| 29599 ||  || — || April 23, 1998 || Socorro || LINEAR || — || align=right | 8.1 km || 
|-id=600 bgcolor=#d6d6d6
| 29600 ||  || — || April 19, 1998 || Socorro || LINEAR || — || align=right | 11 km || 
|}

29601–29700 

|-bgcolor=#d6d6d6
| 29601 ||  || — || May 22, 1998 || Socorro || LINEAR || — || align=right | 9.8 km || 
|-id=602 bgcolor=#fefefe
| 29602 ||  || — || June 1, 1998 || La Silla || E. W. Elst || — || align=right | 2.9 km || 
|-id=603 bgcolor=#C2FFFF
| 29603 ||  || — || June 19, 1998 || Socorro || LINEAR || L5 || align=right | 33 km || 
|-id=604 bgcolor=#E9E9E9
| 29604 ||  || — || August 24, 1998 || Caussols || ODAS || JUN || align=right | 3.9 km || 
|-id=605 bgcolor=#fefefe
| 29605 Joshuacolwell ||  ||  || August 27, 1998 || Anderson Mesa || LONEOS || V || align=right | 2.1 km || 
|-id=606 bgcolor=#fefefe
| 29606 ||  || — || August 17, 1998 || Socorro || LINEAR || PHO || align=right | 2.8 km || 
|-id=607 bgcolor=#fefefe
| 29607 Jakehecla ||  ||  || August 28, 1998 || Socorro || LINEAR || — || align=right | 2.0 km || 
|-id=608 bgcolor=#fefefe
| 29608 ||  || — || September 14, 1998 || Socorro || LINEAR || — || align=right | 1.3 km || 
|-id=609 bgcolor=#E9E9E9
| 29609 Claudiahuang ||  ||  || September 14, 1998 || Socorro || LINEAR || GEF || align=right | 3.7 km || 
|-id=610 bgcolor=#fefefe
| 29610 Iyengar ||  ||  || September 14, 1998 || Socorro || LINEAR || — || align=right | 2.4 km || 
|-id=611 bgcolor=#fefefe
| 29611 ||  || — || September 14, 1998 || Socorro || LINEAR || — || align=right | 1.3 km || 
|-id=612 bgcolor=#fefefe
| 29612 Cindyjiang ||  ||  || September 14, 1998 || Socorro || LINEAR || — || align=right | 2.7 km || 
|-id=613 bgcolor=#fefefe
| 29613 Charlespicard ||  ||  || September 16, 1998 || Prescott || P. G. Comba || — || align=right | 1.4 km || 
|-id=614 bgcolor=#fefefe
| 29614 Sheller ||  ||  || September 22, 1998 || Caussols || ODAS || — || align=right | 1.8 km || 
|-id=615 bgcolor=#fefefe
| 29615 ||  || — || September 26, 1998 || Kitt Peak || Spacewatch || — || align=right | 2.7 km || 
|-id=616 bgcolor=#fefefe
| 29616 ||  || — || September 20, 1998 || La Silla || E. W. Elst || — || align=right | 2.6 km || 
|-id=617 bgcolor=#fefefe
| 29617 ||  || — || September 26, 1998 || Socorro || LINEAR || — || align=right | 2.2 km || 
|-id=618 bgcolor=#fefefe
| 29618 Jinandrew ||  ||  || September 26, 1998 || Socorro || LINEAR || — || align=right | 4.7 km || 
|-id=619 bgcolor=#fefefe
| 29619 Kapurubandage ||  ||  || September 26, 1998 || Socorro || LINEAR || FLO || align=right | 2.2 km || 
|-id=620 bgcolor=#fefefe
| 29620 Gurbanikaur ||  ||  || September 26, 1998 || Socorro || LINEAR || FLO || align=right | 1.9 km || 
|-id=621 bgcolor=#fefefe
| 29621 ||  || — || September 26, 1998 || Socorro || LINEAR || — || align=right | 1.7 km || 
|-id=622 bgcolor=#fefefe
| 29622 ||  || — || September 20, 1998 || La Silla || E. W. Elst || — || align=right | 4.5 km || 
|-id=623 bgcolor=#fefefe
| 29623 ||  || — || September 30, 1998 || Xinglong || SCAP || CHL || align=right | 8.0 km || 
|-id=624 bgcolor=#fefefe
| 29624 Sugiyama || 1998 TA ||  || October 2, 1998 || Mishima || M. Akiyama || V || align=right | 4.2 km || 
|-id=625 bgcolor=#d6d6d6
| 29625 ||  || — || October 14, 1998 || Caussols || ODAS || — || align=right | 4.7 km || 
|-id=626 bgcolor=#fefefe
| 29626 ||  || — || October 13, 1998 || Kitt Peak || Spacewatch || NYS || align=right | 4.0 km || 
|-id=627 bgcolor=#fefefe
| 29627 ||  || — || October 13, 1998 || Kitt Peak || Spacewatch || — || align=right | 3.0 km || 
|-id=628 bgcolor=#fefefe
| 29628 Fedorets ||  ||  || October 10, 1998 || Anderson Mesa || LONEOS || FLO || align=right | 3.9 km || 
|-id=629 bgcolor=#fefefe
| 29629 ||  || — || October 26, 1998 || Višnjan Observatory || K. Korlević || — || align=right | 2.3 km || 
|-id=630 bgcolor=#E9E9E9
| 29630 ||  || — || October 29, 1998 || Xinglong || SCAP || EUN || align=right | 4.1 km || 
|-id=631 bgcolor=#fefefe
| 29631 Ryankenny ||  ||  || October 28, 1998 || Socorro || LINEAR || — || align=right | 1.8 km || 
|-id=632 bgcolor=#fefefe
| 29632 ||  || — || October 19, 1998 || Anderson Mesa || LONEOS || — || align=right | 1.7 km || 
|-id=633 bgcolor=#fefefe
| 29633 Weatherwax ||  ||  || November 10, 1998 || Caussols || ODAS || FLO || align=right | 3.1 km || 
|-id=634 bgcolor=#d6d6d6
| 29634 Sabrinaaksil ||  ||  || November 10, 1998 || Caussols || ODAS || KOR || align=right | 5.3 km || 
|-id=635 bgcolor=#fefefe
| 29635 ||  || — || November 9, 1998 || Gekko || T. Kagawa || — || align=right | 2.7 km || 
|-id=636 bgcolor=#fefefe
| 29636 ||  || — || November 11, 1998 || Nachi-Katsuura || Y. Shimizu, T. Urata || — || align=right | 2.7 km || 
|-id=637 bgcolor=#fefefe
| 29637 ||  || — || November 10, 1998 || Socorro || LINEAR || — || align=right | 3.5 km || 
|-id=638 bgcolor=#fefefe
| 29638 Eeshakhare ||  ||  || November 10, 1998 || Socorro || LINEAR || FLO || align=right | 2.8 km || 
|-id=639 bgcolor=#fefefe
| 29639 ||  || — || November 10, 1998 || Socorro || LINEAR || — || align=right | 1.8 km || 
|-id=640 bgcolor=#E9E9E9
| 29640 ||  || — || November 10, 1998 || Socorro || LINEAR || — || align=right | 2.8 km || 
|-id=641 bgcolor=#fefefe
| 29641 Kaikloepfer ||  ||  || November 10, 1998 || Socorro || LINEAR || — || align=right | 1.7 km || 
|-id=642 bgcolor=#fefefe
| 29642 Archiekong ||  ||  || November 10, 1998 || Socorro || LINEAR || — || align=right | 2.2 km || 
|-id=643 bgcolor=#fefefe
| 29643 Plücker ||  ||  || November 15, 1998 || Prescott || P. G. Comba || FLO || align=right | 2.4 km || 
|-id=644 bgcolor=#fefefe
| 29644 ||  || — || November 11, 1998 || Chichibu || N. Satō || NYS || align=right | 2.2 km || 
|-id=645 bgcolor=#fefefe
| 29645 Kutsenok ||  ||  || November 10, 1998 || Socorro || LINEAR || — || align=right | 1.8 km || 
|-id=646 bgcolor=#fefefe
| 29646 Polya || 1998 WJ ||  || November 16, 1998 || Prescott || P. G. Comba || — || align=right | 1.5 km || 
|-id=647 bgcolor=#fefefe
| 29647 Poncelet || 1998 WY ||  || November 17, 1998 || Prescott || P. G. Comba || NYS || align=right | 2.6 km || 
|-id=648 bgcolor=#E9E9E9
| 29648 ||  || — || November 19, 1998 || Oizumi || T. Kobayashi || — || align=right | 3.7 km || 
|-id=649 bgcolor=#E9E9E9
| 29649 ||  || — || November 23, 1998 || Oizumi || T. Kobayashi || — || align=right | 3.7 km || 
|-id=650 bgcolor=#fefefe
| 29650 Toldy ||  ||  || November 23, 1998 || Modra || A. Galád, P. Kolény || V || align=right | 1.5 km || 
|-id=651 bgcolor=#fefefe
| 29651 ||  || — || November 22, 1998 || Fair Oaks Ranch || J. V. McClusky || — || align=right | 2.1 km || 
|-id=652 bgcolor=#fefefe
| 29652 ||  || — || November 26, 1998 || Višnjan Observatory || K. Korlević || — || align=right | 3.5 km || 
|-id=653 bgcolor=#fefefe
| 29653 ||  || — || November 27, 1998 || Višnjan Observatory || K. Korlević || — || align=right | 2.4 km || 
|-id=654 bgcolor=#fefefe
| 29654 Michaellaue ||  ||  || November 18, 1998 || Socorro || LINEAR || MAS || align=right | 2.3 km || 
|-id=655 bgcolor=#fefefe
| 29655 Yarimlee ||  ||  || November 21, 1998 || Socorro || LINEAR || — || align=right | 2.8 km || 
|-id=656 bgcolor=#fefefe
| 29656 Leejoseph ||  ||  || November 21, 1998 || Socorro || LINEAR || NYS || align=right | 6.4 km || 
|-id=657 bgcolor=#fefefe
| 29657 Andreali ||  ||  || November 21, 1998 || Socorro || LINEAR || NYS || align=right | 2.9 km || 
|-id=658 bgcolor=#fefefe
| 29658 Henrylin ||  ||  || November 21, 1998 || Socorro || LINEAR || FLO || align=right | 3.0 km || 
|-id=659 bgcolor=#fefefe
| 29659 Zeyuliu ||  ||  || November 21, 1998 || Socorro || LINEAR || — || align=right | 2.1 km || 
|-id=660 bgcolor=#fefefe
| 29660 Jessmacalpine ||  ||  || November 18, 1998 || Socorro || LINEAR || — || align=right | 2.0 km || 
|-id=661 bgcolor=#fefefe
| 29661 ||  || — || November 18, 1998 || Socorro || LINEAR || FLO || align=right | 3.9 km || 
|-id=662 bgcolor=#fefefe
| 29662 ||  || — || November 18, 1998 || Socorro || LINEAR || — || align=right | 2.4 km || 
|-id=663 bgcolor=#fefefe
| 29663 Evanmackay ||  ||  || November 18, 1998 || Socorro || LINEAR || — || align=right | 1.9 km || 
|-id=664 bgcolor=#E9E9E9
| 29664 ||  || — || November 25, 1998 || Socorro || LINEAR || EUN || align=right | 6.0 km || 
|-id=665 bgcolor=#d6d6d6
| 29665 ||  || — || November 25, 1998 || Socorro || LINEAR || — || align=right | 21 km || 
|-id=666 bgcolor=#fefefe
| 29666 ||  || — || November 28, 1998 || Višnjan Observatory || K. Korlević || FLO || align=right | 2.9 km || 
|-id=667 bgcolor=#E9E9E9
| 29667 || 1998 XF || — || December 1, 1998 || Xinglong || SCAP || — || align=right | 8.4 km || 
|-id=668 bgcolor=#E9E9E9
| 29668 Ipf || 1998 XO ||  || December 9, 1998 || Kleť || M. Tichý || — || align=right | 3.5 km || 
|-id=669 bgcolor=#fefefe
| 29669 ||  || — || December 11, 1998 || Oizumi || T. Kobayashi || FLO || align=right | 3.8 km || 
|-id=670 bgcolor=#E9E9E9
| 29670 ||  || — || December 12, 1998 || Oizumi || T. Kobayashi || EUN || align=right | 7.1 km || 
|-id=671 bgcolor=#fefefe
| 29671 ||  || — || December 9, 1998 || Višnjan Observatory || K. Korlević || NYS || align=right | 2.1 km || 
|-id=672 bgcolor=#fefefe
| 29672 Salvo ||  ||  || December 12, 1998 || San Marcello || A. Boattini, L. Tesi || NYS || align=right | 2.1 km || 
|-id=673 bgcolor=#fefefe
| 29673 ||  || — || December 13, 1998 || Oizumi || T. Kobayashi || — || align=right | 3.3 km || 
|-id=674 bgcolor=#fefefe
| 29674 Raušal ||  ||  || December 15, 1998 || Ondřejov || P. Pravec || NYS || align=right | 1.5 km || 
|-id=675 bgcolor=#fefefe
| 29675 Ippolitonievo ||  ||  || December 15, 1998 || Farra d'Isonzo || Farra d'Isonzo || — || align=right | 2.2 km || 
|-id=676 bgcolor=#fefefe
| 29676 ||  || — || December 14, 1998 || Socorro || LINEAR || — || align=right | 3.6 km || 
|-id=677 bgcolor=#fefefe
| 29677 ||  || — || December 15, 1998 || Bédoin || P. Antonini || — || align=right | 2.9 km || 
|-id=678 bgcolor=#fefefe
| 29678 ||  || — || December 10, 1998 || Kitt Peak || Spacewatch || NYS || align=right | 1.6 km || 
|-id=679 bgcolor=#fefefe
| 29679 ||  || — || December 11, 1998 || Kitt Peak || Spacewatch || NYS || align=right | 3.1 km || 
|-id=680 bgcolor=#fefefe
| 29680 ||  || — || December 14, 1998 || Socorro || LINEAR || V || align=right | 4.1 km || 
|-id=681 bgcolor=#E9E9E9
| 29681 Saramanshad ||  ||  || December 14, 1998 || Socorro || LINEAR || — || align=right | 2.8 km || 
|-id=682 bgcolor=#fefefe
| 29682 ||  || — || December 14, 1998 || Socorro || LINEAR || V || align=right | 3.7 km || 
|-id=683 bgcolor=#fefefe
| 29683 ||  || — || December 14, 1998 || Socorro || LINEAR || — || align=right | 2.4 km || 
|-id=684 bgcolor=#fefefe
| 29684 ||  || — || December 14, 1998 || Socorro || LINEAR || — || align=right | 4.4 km || 
|-id=685 bgcolor=#fefefe
| 29685 Soibamansoor ||  ||  || December 14, 1998 || Socorro || LINEAR || V || align=right | 2.5 km || 
|-id=686 bgcolor=#fefefe
| 29686 Raymondmaung ||  ||  || December 14, 1998 || Socorro || LINEAR || V || align=right | 2.1 km || 
|-id=687 bgcolor=#fefefe
| 29687 Mohdreza ||  ||  || December 15, 1998 || Socorro || LINEAR || — || align=right | 2.0 km || 
|-id=688 bgcolor=#E9E9E9
| 29688 ||  || — || December 15, 1998 || Socorro || LINEAR || — || align=right | 4.6 km || 
|-id=689 bgcolor=#fefefe
| 29689 ||  || — || December 15, 1998 || Socorro || LINEAR || V || align=right | 3.0 km || 
|-id=690 bgcolor=#fefefe
| 29690 Nistala ||  ||  || December 15, 1998 || Socorro || LINEAR || — || align=right | 4.1 km || 
|-id=691 bgcolor=#E9E9E9
| 29691 ||  || — || December 11, 1998 || Mérida || O. A. Naranjo || GEF || align=right | 5.0 km || 
|-id=692 bgcolor=#fefefe
| 29692 ||  || — || December 11, 1998 || Mérida || O. A. Naranjo || — || align=right | 2.0 km || 
|-id=693 bgcolor=#fefefe
| 29693 || 1998 YC || — || December 16, 1998 || Višnjan Observatory || K. Korlević || — || align=right | 2.4 km || 
|-id=694 bgcolor=#E9E9E9
| 29694 || 1998 YG || — || December 16, 1998 || Višnjan Observatory || K. Korlević || MIS || align=right | 7.5 km || 
|-id=695 bgcolor=#E9E9E9
| 29695 || 1998 YH || — || December 16, 1998 || Višnjan Observatory || K. Korlević || — || align=right | 4.7 km || 
|-id=696 bgcolor=#E9E9E9
| 29696 Distasio || 1998 YN ||  || December 16, 1998 || Caussols || ODAS || DOR || align=right | 10 km || 
|-id=697 bgcolor=#E9E9E9
| 29697 ||  || — || December 16, 1998 || Višnjan Observatory || K. Korlević || — || align=right | 12 km || 
|-id=698 bgcolor=#fefefe
| 29698 ||  || — || December 17, 1998 || Oizumi || T. Kobayashi || — || align=right | 3.7 km || 
|-id=699 bgcolor=#fefefe
| 29699 ||  || — || December 19, 1998 || Oizumi || T. Kobayashi || FLO || align=right | 1.8 km || 
|-id=700 bgcolor=#fefefe
| 29700 Salmon ||  ||  || December 19, 1998 || Prescott || P. G. Comba || — || align=right | 2.1 km || 
|}

29701–29800 

|-bgcolor=#E9E9E9
| 29701 Peggyhaas ||  ||  || December 20, 1998 || Catalina || CSS || — || align=right | 4.6 km || 
|-id=702 bgcolor=#E9E9E9
| 29702 ||  || — || December 23, 1998 || Farra d'Isonzo || Farra d'Isonzo || — || align=right | 5.9 km || 
|-id=703 bgcolor=#fefefe
| 29703 ||  || — || December 22, 1998 || Oizumi || T. Kobayashi || FLO || align=right | 3.1 km || 
|-id=704 bgcolor=#fefefe
| 29704 ||  || — || December 23, 1998 || Xinglong || SCAP || FLO || align=right | 1.6 km || 
|-id=705 bgcolor=#E9E9E9
| 29705 Cialucy ||  ||  || December 26, 1998 || San Marcello || A. Boattini, L. Tesi || — || align=right | 4.5 km || 
|-id=706 bgcolor=#fefefe
| 29706 Simonetta ||  ||  || December 25, 1998 || San Marcello || A. Boattini, L. Tesi || — || align=right | 2.3 km || 
|-id=707 bgcolor=#fefefe
| 29707 ||  || — || December 22, 1998 || Kitt Peak || Spacewatch || — || align=right | 3.4 km || 
|-id=708 bgcolor=#fefefe
| 29708 ||  || — || December 22, 1998 || Kitt Peak || Spacewatch || FLO || align=right | 2.4 km || 
|-id=709 bgcolor=#fefefe
| 29709 ||  || — || January 9, 1999 || Oizumi || T. Kobayashi || NYS || align=right | 3.7 km || 
|-id=710 bgcolor=#E9E9E9
| 29710 ||  || — || January 9, 1999 || Oizumi || T. Kobayashi || — || align=right | 3.5 km || 
|-id=711 bgcolor=#d6d6d6
| 29711 ||  || — || January 12, 1999 || Oizumi || T. Kobayashi || TEL || align=right | 4.2 km || 
|-id=712 bgcolor=#fefefe
| 29712 ||  || — || January 9, 1999 || Višnjan Observatory || K. Korlević || FLO || align=right | 2.0 km || 
|-id=713 bgcolor=#fefefe
| 29713 ||  || — || January 10, 1999 || Višnjan Observatory || K. Korlević || V || align=right | 2.7 km || 
|-id=714 bgcolor=#fefefe
| 29714 ||  || — || January 10, 1999 || Višnjan Observatory || K. Korlević || V || align=right | 2.2 km || 
|-id=715 bgcolor=#E9E9E9
| 29715 ||  || — || January 13, 1999 || Oizumi || T. Kobayashi || — || align=right | 5.0 km || 
|-id=716 bgcolor=#fefefe
| 29716 ||  || — || January 13, 1999 || Oizumi || T. Kobayashi || — || align=right | 3.2 km || 
|-id=717 bgcolor=#fefefe
| 29717 ||  || — || January 13, 1999 || Oizumi || T. Kobayashi || FLO || align=right | 2.6 km || 
|-id=718 bgcolor=#E9E9E9
| 29718 ||  || — || January 11, 1999 || Kitt Peak || Spacewatch || JUN || align=right | 6.0 km || 
|-id=719 bgcolor=#d6d6d6
| 29719 ||  || — || January 13, 1999 || Kitt Peak || Spacewatch || — || align=right | 17 km || 
|-id=720 bgcolor=#E9E9E9
| 29720 ||  || — || January 13, 1999 || Kitt Peak || Spacewatch || — || align=right | 2.7 km || 
|-id=721 bgcolor=#fefefe
| 29721 ||  || — || January 13, 1999 || Gekko || T. Kagawa || V || align=right | 1.8 km || 
|-id=722 bgcolor=#E9E9E9
| 29722 ||  || — || January 14, 1999 || Anderson Mesa || LONEOS || — || align=right | 7.0 km || 
|-id=723 bgcolor=#fefefe
| 29723 ||  || — || January 14, 1999 || Višnjan Observatory || Višnjan Obs. || — || align=right | 3.5 km || 
|-id=724 bgcolor=#E9E9E9
| 29724 ||  || — || January 15, 1999 || Caussols || ODAS || — || align=right | 4.8 km || 
|-id=725 bgcolor=#d6d6d6
| 29725 Mikewest ||  ||  || January 15, 1999 || Caussols || ODAS || — || align=right | 8.6 km || 
|-id=726 bgcolor=#E9E9E9
| 29726 ||  || — || January 9, 1999 || Uenohara || N. Kawasato || — || align=right | 3.3 km || 
|-id=727 bgcolor=#fefefe
| 29727 ||  || — || January 15, 1999 || Kitt Peak || Spacewatch || — || align=right | 2.2 km || 
|-id=728 bgcolor=#fefefe
| 29728 ||  || — || January 14, 1999 || Anderson Mesa || LONEOS || — || align=right | 3.1 km || 
|-id=729 bgcolor=#fefefe
| 29729 ||  || — || January 18, 1999 || Socorro || LINEAR || PHO || align=right | 4.3 km || 
|-id=730 bgcolor=#fefefe
| 29730 ||  || — || January 18, 1999 || Catalina || CSS || PHO || align=right | 4.7 km || 
|-id=731 bgcolor=#E9E9E9
| 29731 ||  || — || January 19, 1999 || Oizumi || T. Kobayashi || — || align=right | 7.4 km || 
|-id=732 bgcolor=#fefefe
| 29732 ||  || — || January 19, 1999 || Oizumi || T. Kobayashi || — || align=right | 6.5 km || 
|-id=733 bgcolor=#fefefe
| 29733 ||  || — || January 18, 1999 || Gekko || T. Kagawa || slow || align=right | 3.5 km || 
|-id=734 bgcolor=#fefefe
| 29734 ||  || — || January 21, 1999 || Višnjan Observatory || K. Korlević || — || align=right | 2.2 km || 
|-id=735 bgcolor=#E9E9E9
| 29735 ||  || — || January 21, 1999 || Caussols || ODAS || — || align=right | 10 km || 
|-id=736 bgcolor=#fefefe
| 29736 Fichtelberg ||  ||  || January 21, 1999 || Drebach || J. Kandler || V || align=right | 2.0 km || 
|-id=737 bgcolor=#E9E9E9
| 29737 Norihiro ||  ||  || January 21, 1999 || Kuma Kogen || A. Nakamura || GEF || align=right | 3.5 km || 
|-id=738 bgcolor=#fefefe
| 29738 Ivobudil ||  ||  || January 23, 1999 || Kleť || J. Tichá, M. Tichý || — || align=right | 2.6 km || 
|-id=739 bgcolor=#fefefe
| 29739 ||  || — || January 16, 1999 || Woomera || F. B. Zoltowski || NYS || align=right | 2.9 km || 
|-id=740 bgcolor=#E9E9E9
| 29740 ||  || — || January 19, 1999 || Črni Vrh || Črni Vrh || — || align=right | 5.6 km || 
|-id=741 bgcolor=#fefefe
| 29741 ||  || — || January 24, 1999 || Višnjan Observatory || K. Korlević || FLO || align=right | 2.6 km || 
|-id=742 bgcolor=#E9E9E9
| 29742 ||  || — || January 24, 1999 || Črni Vrh || Črni Vrh || MAR || align=right | 7.3 km || 
|-id=743 bgcolor=#E9E9E9
| 29743 ||  || — || January 26, 1999 || Višnjan Observatory || K. Korlević || EUN || align=right | 3.4 km || 
|-id=744 bgcolor=#E9E9E9
| 29744 ||  || — || January 16, 1999 || Socorro || LINEAR || MAR || align=right | 4.3 km || 
|-id=745 bgcolor=#fefefe
| 29745 Mareknovak ||  ||  || January 16, 1999 || Socorro || LINEAR || — || align=right | 3.0 km || 
|-id=746 bgcolor=#fefefe
| 29746 ||  || — || January 18, 1999 || Socorro || LINEAR || — || align=right | 2.8 km || 
|-id=747 bgcolor=#fefefe
| 29747 Acorlando ||  ||  || January 18, 1999 || Socorro || LINEAR || — || align=right | 3.3 km || 
|-id=748 bgcolor=#fefefe
| 29748 ||  || — || January 19, 1999 || Kitt Peak || Spacewatch || — || align=right | 2.5 km || 
|-id=749 bgcolor=#fefefe
| 29749 || 1999 CN || — || February 5, 1999 || Oizumi || T. Kobayashi || — || align=right | 2.9 km || 
|-id=750 bgcolor=#fefefe
| 29750 Chleborad ||  ||  || February 8, 1999 || Fountain Hills || C. W. Juels || V || align=right | 5.7 km || 
|-id=751 bgcolor=#d6d6d6
| 29751 ||  || — || February 9, 1999 || Woomera || F. B. Zoltowski || — || align=right | 6.6 km || 
|-id=752 bgcolor=#fefefe
| 29752 ||  || — || February 10, 1999 || Woomera || F. B. Zoltowski || — || align=right | 2.7 km || 
|-id=753 bgcolor=#fefefe
| 29753 Silvo ||  ||  || February 10, 1999 || Gnosca || S. Sposetti || — || align=right | 4.9 km || 
|-id=754 bgcolor=#E9E9E9
| 29754 ||  || — || February 12, 1999 || Oohira || T. Urata || — || align=right | 2.9 km || 
|-id=755 bgcolor=#E9E9E9
| 29755 ||  || — || February 12, 1999 || Oizumi || T. Kobayashi || — || align=right | 4.3 km || 
|-id=756 bgcolor=#E9E9E9
| 29756 ||  || — || February 12, 1999 || Oizumi || T. Kobayashi || — || align=right | 4.1 km || 
|-id=757 bgcolor=#E9E9E9
| 29757 ||  || — || February 13, 1999 || Oizumi || T. Kobayashi || ADE || align=right | 13 km || 
|-id=758 bgcolor=#E9E9E9
| 29758 ||  || — || February 13, 1999 || Oizumi || T. Kobayashi || — || align=right | 5.7 km || 
|-id=759 bgcolor=#E9E9E9
| 29759 ||  || — || February 12, 1999 || Višnjan Observatory || K. Korlević || — || align=right | 3.0 km || 
|-id=760 bgcolor=#E9E9E9
| 29760 Milevsko ||  ||  || February 15, 1999 || Kleť || Kleť Obs. || XIZ || align=right | 6.5 km || 
|-id=761 bgcolor=#fefefe
| 29761 Lorenzo ||  ||  || February 13, 1999 || Montelupo || M. Tombelli, S. Bartolini || NYS || align=right | 2.4 km || 
|-id=762 bgcolor=#fefefe
| 29762 Panasiewicz ||  ||  || February 10, 1999 || Socorro || LINEAR || V || align=right | 3.2 km || 
|-id=763 bgcolor=#fefefe
| 29763 ||  || — || February 10, 1999 || Socorro || LINEAR || — || align=right | 6.8 km || 
|-id=764 bgcolor=#E9E9E9
| 29764 Panneerselvam ||  ||  || February 10, 1999 || Socorro || LINEAR || — || align=right | 3.6 km || 
|-id=765 bgcolor=#fefefe
| 29765 Miparedes ||  ||  || February 10, 1999 || Socorro || LINEAR || — || align=right | 5.8 km || 
|-id=766 bgcolor=#fefefe
| 29766 ||  || — || February 10, 1999 || Socorro || LINEAR || — || align=right | 3.5 km || 
|-id=767 bgcolor=#E9E9E9
| 29767 ||  || — || February 10, 1999 || Socorro || LINEAR || — || align=right | 9.2 km || 
|-id=768 bgcolor=#d6d6d6
| 29768 ||  || — || February 10, 1999 || Socorro || LINEAR || — || align=right | 6.0 km || 
|-id=769 bgcolor=#E9E9E9
| 29769 ||  || — || February 10, 1999 || Socorro || LINEAR || ADE || align=right | 24 km || 
|-id=770 bgcolor=#fefefe
| 29770 Timmpiper ||  ||  || February 10, 1999 || Socorro || LINEAR || V || align=right | 2.0 km || 
|-id=771 bgcolor=#d6d6d6
| 29771 ||  || — || February 10, 1999 || Socorro || LINEAR || THM || align=right | 7.0 km || 
|-id=772 bgcolor=#E9E9E9
| 29772 Portocarrero ||  ||  || February 10, 1999 || Socorro || LINEAR || — || align=right | 5.2 km || 
|-id=773 bgcolor=#d6d6d6
| 29773 Samuelpritt ||  ||  || February 10, 1999 || Socorro || LINEAR || THM || align=right | 8.0 km || 
|-id=774 bgcolor=#fefefe
| 29774 ||  || — || February 10, 1999 || Socorro || LINEAR || FLO || align=right | 2.1 km || 
|-id=775 bgcolor=#fefefe
| 29775 ||  || — || February 10, 1999 || Socorro || LINEAR || — || align=right | 5.5 km || 
|-id=776 bgcolor=#E9E9E9
| 29776 Radzhabov ||  ||  || February 10, 1999 || Socorro || LINEAR || — || align=right | 4.6 km || 
|-id=777 bgcolor=#d6d6d6
| 29777 ||  || — || February 10, 1999 || Socorro || LINEAR || — || align=right | 7.7 km || 
|-id=778 bgcolor=#E9E9E9
| 29778 ||  || — || February 10, 1999 || Socorro || LINEAR || — || align=right | 4.3 km || 
|-id=779 bgcolor=#d6d6d6
| 29779 ||  || — || February 10, 1999 || Socorro || LINEAR || — || align=right | 5.0 km || 
|-id=780 bgcolor=#FA8072
| 29780 ||  || — || February 10, 1999 || Socorro || LINEAR || — || align=right | 2.4 km || 
|-id=781 bgcolor=#fefefe
| 29781 ||  || — || February 10, 1999 || Socorro || LINEAR || NYS || align=right | 3.5 km || 
|-id=782 bgcolor=#E9E9E9
| 29782 ||  || — || February 10, 1999 || Socorro || LINEAR || — || align=right | 3.7 km || 
|-id=783 bgcolor=#fefefe
| 29783 Sanjanarane ||  ||  || February 10, 1999 || Socorro || LINEAR || NYS || align=right | 3.1 km || 
|-id=784 bgcolor=#E9E9E9
| 29784 ||  || — || February 10, 1999 || Socorro || LINEAR || — || align=right | 12 km || 
|-id=785 bgcolor=#E9E9E9
| 29785 ||  || — || February 10, 1999 || Socorro || LINEAR || — || align=right | 4.2 km || 
|-id=786 bgcolor=#E9E9E9
| 29786 ||  || — || February 10, 1999 || Socorro || LINEAR || — || align=right | 3.7 km || 
|-id=787 bgcolor=#E9E9E9
| 29787 Timrenier ||  ||  || February 10, 1999 || Socorro || LINEAR || — || align=right | 5.5 km || 
|-id=788 bgcolor=#E9E9E9
| 29788 Rachelrossi ||  ||  || February 12, 1999 || Socorro || LINEAR || — || align=right | 3.6 km || 
|-id=789 bgcolor=#E9E9E9
| 29789 ||  || — || February 12, 1999 || Socorro || LINEAR || MAR || align=right | 5.0 km || 
|-id=790 bgcolor=#E9E9E9
| 29790 ||  || — || February 12, 1999 || Socorro || LINEAR || EUN || align=right | 4.6 km || 
|-id=791 bgcolor=#E9E9E9
| 29791 ||  || — || February 12, 1999 || Socorro || LINEAR || EUN || align=right | 5.5 km || 
|-id=792 bgcolor=#d6d6d6
| 29792 ||  || — || February 12, 1999 || Socorro || LINEAR || EOS || align=right | 6.3 km || 
|-id=793 bgcolor=#E9E9E9
| 29793 ||  || — || February 12, 1999 || Socorro || LINEAR || — || align=right | 12 km || 
|-id=794 bgcolor=#E9E9E9
| 29794 ||  || — || February 12, 1999 || Socorro || LINEAR || — || align=right | 5.9 km || 
|-id=795 bgcolor=#E9E9E9
| 29795 ||  || — || February 12, 1999 || Socorro || LINEAR || MRX || align=right | 5.0 km || 
|-id=796 bgcolor=#fefefe
| 29796 ||  || — || February 12, 1999 || Socorro || LINEAR || — || align=right | 4.9 km || 
|-id=797 bgcolor=#E9E9E9
| 29797 ||  || — || February 12, 1999 || Socorro || LINEAR || EUN || align=right | 5.5 km || 
|-id=798 bgcolor=#E9E9E9
| 29798 ||  || — || February 12, 1999 || Socorro || LINEAR || EUN || align=right | 6.4 km || 
|-id=799 bgcolor=#d6d6d6
| 29799 Trinirussell ||  ||  || February 12, 1999 || Socorro || LINEAR || EOS || align=right | 4.8 km || 
|-id=800 bgcolor=#fefefe
| 29800 Valeriesarge ||  ||  || February 10, 1999 || Socorro || LINEAR || V || align=right | 2.7 km || 
|}

29801–29900 

|-bgcolor=#fefefe
| 29801 ||  || — || February 10, 1999 || Socorro || LINEAR || — || align=right | 4.1 km || 
|-id=802 bgcolor=#E9E9E9
| 29802 Rikhavshah ||  ||  || February 10, 1999 || Socorro || LINEAR || — || align=right | 5.0 km || 
|-id=803 bgcolor=#E9E9E9
| 29803 Michaelshao ||  ||  || February 10, 1999 || Socorro || LINEAR || — || align=right | 2.3 km || 
|-id=804 bgcolor=#fefefe
| 29804 Idansharon ||  ||  || February 10, 1999 || Socorro || LINEAR || NYS || align=right | 6.5 km || 
|-id=805 bgcolor=#fefefe
| 29805 Bradleysloop ||  ||  || February 10, 1999 || Socorro || LINEAR || FLO || align=right | 2.6 km || 
|-id=806 bgcolor=#fefefe
| 29806 Eviesobczak ||  ||  || February 10, 1999 || Socorro || LINEAR || — || align=right | 5.0 km || 
|-id=807 bgcolor=#E9E9E9
| 29807 ||  || — || February 10, 1999 || Socorro || LINEAR || — || align=right | 6.3 km || 
|-id=808 bgcolor=#E9E9E9
| 29808 Youssoliman ||  ||  || February 10, 1999 || Socorro || LINEAR || — || align=right | 2.7 km || 
|-id=809 bgcolor=#E9E9E9
| 29809 ||  || — || February 12, 1999 || Socorro || LINEAR || PAE || align=right | 7.4 km || 
|-id=810 bgcolor=#E9E9E9
| 29810 ||  || — || February 12, 1999 || Socorro || LINEAR || — || align=right | 3.4 km || 
|-id=811 bgcolor=#E9E9E9
| 29811 ||  || — || February 12, 1999 || Socorro || LINEAR || ADE || align=right | 7.0 km || 
|-id=812 bgcolor=#fefefe
| 29812 Aaronsolomon ||  ||  || February 12, 1999 || Socorro || LINEAR || — || align=right | 2.7 km || 
|-id=813 bgcolor=#E9E9E9
| 29813 ||  || — || February 12, 1999 || Socorro || LINEAR || — || align=right | 4.3 km || 
|-id=814 bgcolor=#d6d6d6
| 29814 ||  || — || February 12, 1999 || Socorro || LINEAR || — || align=right | 6.7 km || 
|-id=815 bgcolor=#E9E9E9
| 29815 ||  || — || February 12, 1999 || Socorro || LINEAR || WAT || align=right | 5.1 km || 
|-id=816 bgcolor=#d6d6d6
| 29816 ||  || — || February 12, 1999 || Socorro || LINEAR || — || align=right | 5.9 km || 
|-id=817 bgcolor=#fefefe
| 29817 ||  || — || February 12, 1999 || Socorro || LINEAR || — || align=right | 3.7 km || 
|-id=818 bgcolor=#fefefe
| 29818 Aryosorayya ||  ||  || February 12, 1999 || Socorro || LINEAR || — || align=right | 3.4 km || 
|-id=819 bgcolor=#d6d6d6
| 29819 ||  || — || February 11, 1999 || Socorro || LINEAR || — || align=right | 16 km || 
|-id=820 bgcolor=#d6d6d6
| 29820 ||  || — || February 13, 1999 || Kitt Peak || Spacewatch || THM || align=right | 9.5 km || 
|-id=821 bgcolor=#E9E9E9
| 29821 ||  || — || February 17, 1999 || Nachi-Katsuura || Y. Shimizu, T. Urata || EUN || align=right | 6.9 km || 
|-id=822 bgcolor=#E9E9E9
| 29822 ||  || — || February 19, 1999 || Zeno || T. Stafford || — || align=right | 4.5 km || 
|-id=823 bgcolor=#E9E9E9
| 29823 ||  || — || February 20, 1999 || Nachi-Katsuura || Y. Shimizu, T. Urata || — || align=right | 7.1 km || 
|-id=824 bgcolor=#d6d6d6
| 29824 Kalmančok ||  ||  || February 23, 1999 || Modra || L. Kornoš, J. Tóth || THM || align=right | 5.0 km || 
|-id=825 bgcolor=#E9E9E9
| 29825 Dunyazade ||  ||  || February 20, 1999 || Goodricke-Pigott || R. A. Tucker || — || align=right | 2.6 km || 
|-id=826 bgcolor=#fefefe
| 29826 ||  || — || February 23, 1999 || Socorro || LINEAR || — || align=right | 4.8 km || 
|-id=827 bgcolor=#E9E9E9
| 29827 ||  || — || February 18, 1999 || Anderson Mesa || LONEOS || — || align=right | 6.4 km || 
|-id=828 bgcolor=#fefefe
| 29828 ||  || — || February 16, 1999 || Kitt Peak || Spacewatch || — || align=right | 2.3 km || 
|-id=829 bgcolor=#E9E9E9
| 29829 Engels ||  ||  || March 14, 1999 || Monte Agliale || M. M. M. Santangelo || — || align=right | 6.3 km || 
|-id=830 bgcolor=#E9E9E9
| 29830 ||  || — || March 14, 1999 || Višnjan Observatory || K. Korlević || — || align=right | 12 km || 
|-id=831 bgcolor=#E9E9E9
| 29831 ||  || — || March 13, 1999 || Woomera || F. B. Zoltowski || — || align=right | 7.3 km || 
|-id=832 bgcolor=#E9E9E9
| 29832 Steinwehr ||  ||  || March 15, 1999 || Socorro || LINEAR || — || align=right | 4.5 km || 
|-id=833 bgcolor=#E9E9E9
| 29833 || 1999 FJ || — || March 16, 1999 || Višnjan Observatory || K. Korlević, M. Jurić || — || align=right | 6.8 km || 
|-id=834 bgcolor=#d6d6d6
| 29834 Mariacallas ||  ||  || March 17, 1999 || Caussols || ODAS || KOR || align=right | 5.2 km || 
|-id=835 bgcolor=#fefefe
| 29835 ||  || — || March 16, 1999 || Kitt Peak || Spacewatch || — || align=right | 3.1 km || 
|-id=836 bgcolor=#E9E9E9
| 29836 ||  || — || March 16, 1999 || Kitt Peak || Spacewatch || — || align=right | 2.5 km || 
|-id=837 bgcolor=#d6d6d6
| 29837 Savage ||  ||  || March 21, 1999 || Prescott || P. G. Comba || EOS || align=right | 6.6 km || 
|-id=838 bgcolor=#d6d6d6
| 29838 ||  || — || March 20, 1999 || Caussols || ODAS || THM || align=right | 7.4 km || 
|-id=839 bgcolor=#d6d6d6
| 29839 Russhoward ||  ||  || March 19, 1999 || Anderson Mesa || LONEOS || THM || align=right | 7.9 km || 
|-id=840 bgcolor=#d6d6d6
| 29840 ||  || — || March 18, 1999 || Kitt Peak || Spacewatch || — || align=right | 9.5 km || 
|-id=841 bgcolor=#E9E9E9
| 29841 ||  || — || March 19, 1999 || Kitt Peak || Spacewatch || HEN || align=right | 2.9 km || 
|-id=842 bgcolor=#d6d6d6
| 29842 ||  || — || March 20, 1999 || Anderson Mesa || LONEOS || — || align=right | 10 km || 
|-id=843 bgcolor=#d6d6d6
| 29843 ||  || — || March 22, 1999 || Anderson Mesa || LONEOS || — || align=right | 8.4 km || 
|-id=844 bgcolor=#E9E9E9
| 29844 ||  || — || March 22, 1999 || Anderson Mesa || LONEOS || — || align=right | 5.1 km || 
|-id=845 bgcolor=#fefefe
| 29845 Wykrota ||  ||  || March 22, 1999 || Wykrota || C. Jacques || — || align=right | 3.8 km || 
|-id=846 bgcolor=#E9E9E9
| 29846 ||  || — || March 19, 1999 || Socorro || LINEAR || — || align=right | 9.2 km || 
|-id=847 bgcolor=#E9E9E9
| 29847 ||  || — || March 19, 1999 || Socorro || LINEAR || — || align=right | 7.5 km || 
|-id=848 bgcolor=#d6d6d6
| 29848 ||  || — || March 19, 1999 || Socorro || LINEAR || HYG || align=right | 11 km || 
|-id=849 bgcolor=#d6d6d6
| 29849 ||  || — || March 19, 1999 || Socorro || LINEAR || EOS || align=right | 5.6 km || 
|-id=850 bgcolor=#E9E9E9
| 29850 Tanakagyou ||  ||  || March 19, 1999 || Socorro || LINEAR || — || align=right | 5.3 km || 
|-id=851 bgcolor=#d6d6d6
| 29851 ||  || — || March 19, 1999 || Socorro || LINEAR || KOR || align=right | 6.4 km || 
|-id=852 bgcolor=#E9E9E9
| 29852 Niralithakor ||  ||  || March 19, 1999 || Socorro || LINEAR || MRX || align=right | 3.6 km || 
|-id=853 bgcolor=#d6d6d6
| 29853 ||  || — || March 19, 1999 || Socorro || LINEAR || — || align=right | 12 km || 
|-id=854 bgcolor=#E9E9E9
| 29854 ||  || — || March 19, 1999 || Socorro || LINEAR || — || align=right | 6.3 km || 
|-id=855 bgcolor=#E9E9E9
| 29855 ||  || — || March 19, 1999 || Socorro || LINEAR || — || align=right | 8.1 km || 
|-id=856 bgcolor=#E9E9E9
| 29856 ||  || — || March 19, 1999 || Socorro || LINEAR || — || align=right | 6.8 km || 
|-id=857 bgcolor=#d6d6d6
| 29857 ||  || — || March 19, 1999 || Socorro || LINEAR || KOR || align=right | 5.4 km || 
|-id=858 bgcolor=#E9E9E9
| 29858 Tlomak ||  ||  || March 19, 1999 || Socorro || LINEAR || AGN || align=right | 5.5 km || 
|-id=859 bgcolor=#E9E9E9
| 29859 ||  || — || March 19, 1999 || Socorro || LINEAR || — || align=right | 8.9 km || 
|-id=860 bgcolor=#d6d6d6
| 29860 ||  || — || March 19, 1999 || Socorro || LINEAR || — || align=right | 9.4 km || 
|-id=861 bgcolor=#d6d6d6
| 29861 ||  || — || March 20, 1999 || Socorro || LINEAR || — || align=right | 13 km || 
|-id=862 bgcolor=#fefefe
| 29862 Savannahjoy ||  ||  || March 20, 1999 || Socorro || LINEAR || — || align=right | 2.6 km || 
|-id=863 bgcolor=#E9E9E9
| 29863 ||  || — || March 20, 1999 || Socorro || LINEAR || — || align=right | 6.4 km || 
|-id=864 bgcolor=#E9E9E9
| 29864 ||  || — || March 20, 1999 || Socorro || LINEAR || ADE || align=right | 7.3 km || 
|-id=865 bgcolor=#d6d6d6
| 29865 ||  || — || March 20, 1999 || Socorro || LINEAR || — || align=right | 17 km || 
|-id=866 bgcolor=#d6d6d6
| 29866 ||  || — || March 20, 1999 || Socorro || LINEAR || KOR || align=right | 4.5 km || 
|-id=867 bgcolor=#E9E9E9
| 29867 ||  || — || March 20, 1999 || Socorro || LINEAR || — || align=right | 7.9 km || 
|-id=868 bgcolor=#E9E9E9
| 29868 ||  || — || March 20, 1999 || Socorro || LINEAR || — || align=right | 4.8 km || 
|-id=869 bgcolor=#d6d6d6
| 29869 Chiarabarbara ||  ||  || April 4, 1999 || San Marcello || A. Boattini, G. D'Abramo || — || align=right | 6.7 km || 
|-id=870 bgcolor=#E9E9E9
| 29870 ||  || — || April 11, 1999 || Fountain Hills || C. W. Juels || — || align=right | 6.6 km || 
|-id=871 bgcolor=#E9E9E9
| 29871 ||  || — || April 7, 1999 || Nachi-Katsuura || Y. Shimizu, T. Urata || GEF || align=right | 5.9 km || 
|-id=872 bgcolor=#E9E9E9
| 29872 ||  || — || April 15, 1999 || Reedy Creek || J. Broughton || — || align=right | 5.8 km || 
|-id=873 bgcolor=#E9E9E9
| 29873 ||  || — || April 10, 1999 || Anderson Mesa || LONEOS || — || align=right | 3.0 km || 
|-id=874 bgcolor=#E9E9E9
| 29874 Rogerculver ||  ||  || April 14, 1999 || Goodricke-Pigott || R. A. Tucker || RAF || align=right | 3.1 km || 
|-id=875 bgcolor=#d6d6d6
| 29875 ||  || — || April 14, 1999 || Kitt Peak || Spacewatch || — || align=right | 7.6 km || 
|-id=876 bgcolor=#d6d6d6
| 29876 ||  || — || April 15, 1999 || Socorro || LINEAR || — || align=right | 8.5 km || 
|-id=877 bgcolor=#E9E9E9
| 29877 ||  || — || April 15, 1999 || Socorro || LINEAR || — || align=right | 13 km || 
|-id=878 bgcolor=#E9E9E9
| 29878 ||  || — || April 15, 1999 || Socorro || LINEAR || — || align=right | 5.4 km || 
|-id=879 bgcolor=#d6d6d6
| 29879 ||  || — || April 15, 1999 || Socorro || LINEAR || EOS || align=right | 9.9 km || 
|-id=880 bgcolor=#d6d6d6
| 29880 Andytran ||  ||  || April 7, 1999 || Socorro || LINEAR || THM || align=right | 7.3 km || 
|-id=881 bgcolor=#d6d6d6
| 29881 Tschopp ||  ||  || April 7, 1999 || Socorro || LINEAR || THM || align=right | 6.5 km || 
|-id=882 bgcolor=#E9E9E9
| 29882 ||  || — || April 7, 1999 || Socorro || LINEAR || EUN || align=right | 3.8 km || 
|-id=883 bgcolor=#d6d6d6
| 29883 ||  || — || April 7, 1999 || Socorro || LINEAR || — || align=right | 7.1 km || 
|-id=884 bgcolor=#E9E9E9
| 29884 ||  || — || April 7, 1999 || Socorro || LINEAR || — || align=right | 5.2 km || 
|-id=885 bgcolor=#d6d6d6
| 29885 ||  || — || April 7, 1999 || Socorro || LINEAR || — || align=right | 8.5 km || 
|-id=886 bgcolor=#fefefe
| 29886 Randytung ||  ||  || April 7, 1999 || Socorro || LINEAR || NYS || align=right | 2.4 km || 
|-id=887 bgcolor=#d6d6d6
| 29887 ||  || — || April 6, 1999 || Socorro || LINEAR || — || align=right | 4.6 km || 
|-id=888 bgcolor=#d6d6d6
| 29888 ||  || — || April 7, 1999 || Socorro || LINEAR || TEL || align=right | 5.3 km || 
|-id=889 bgcolor=#E9E9E9
| 29889 ||  || — || April 12, 1999 || Socorro || LINEAR || — || align=right | 4.0 km || 
|-id=890 bgcolor=#d6d6d6
| 29890 ||  || — || April 12, 1999 || Socorro || LINEAR || MELslow || align=right | 14 km || 
|-id=891 bgcolor=#d6d6d6
| 29891 ||  || — || April 12, 1999 || Socorro || LINEAR || VER || align=right | 14 km || 
|-id=892 bgcolor=#E9E9E9
| 29892 ||  || — || April 12, 1999 || Socorro || LINEAR || — || align=right | 5.4 km || 
|-id=893 bgcolor=#E9E9E9
| 29893 ||  || — || April 12, 1999 || Socorro || LINEAR || EUN || align=right | 5.0 km || 
|-id=894 bgcolor=#d6d6d6
| 29894 ||  || — || April 12, 1999 || Socorro || LINEAR || — || align=right | 7.0 km || 
|-id=895 bgcolor=#d6d6d6
| 29895 ||  || — || April 11, 1999 || Anderson Mesa || LONEOS || — || align=right | 18 km || 
|-id=896 bgcolor=#E9E9E9
| 29896 ||  || — || April 7, 1999 || Socorro || LINEAR || — || align=right | 6.7 km || 
|-id=897 bgcolor=#d6d6d6
| 29897 Kossen ||  ||  || April 7, 1999 || Anderson Mesa || LONEOS || — || align=right | 12 km || 
|-id=898 bgcolor=#d6d6d6
| 29898 Richardnugent ||  ||  || April 19, 1999 || Reedy Creek || J. Broughton || — || align=right | 9.5 km || 
|-id=899 bgcolor=#E9E9E9
| 29899 ||  || — || April 20, 1999 || Bergisch Gladbach || W. Bickel || — || align=right | 3.7 km || 
|-id=900 bgcolor=#d6d6d6
| 29900 ||  || — || April 17, 1999 || Kitt Peak || Spacewatch || — || align=right | 5.4 km || 
|}

29901–30000 

|-bgcolor=#fefefe
| 29901 ||  || — || April 19, 1999 || Kitt Peak || Spacewatch || — || align=right | 4.5 km || 
|-id=902 bgcolor=#E9E9E9
| 29902 ||  || — || April 16, 1999 || Socorro || LINEAR || — || align=right | 8.3 km || 
|-id=903 bgcolor=#d6d6d6
| 29903 ||  || — || April 17, 1999 || Socorro || LINEAR || 615 || align=right | 8.6 km || 
|-id=904 bgcolor=#d6d6d6
| 29904 ||  || — || April 17, 1999 || Socorro || LINEAR || URS || align=right | 11 km || 
|-id=905 bgcolor=#E9E9E9
| 29905 Kunitaka ||  ||  || April 21, 1999 || Nanyo || T. Okuni || — || align=right | 9.2 km || 
|-id=906 bgcolor=#d6d6d6
| 29906 ||  || — || April 16, 1999 || Socorro || LINEAR || — || align=right | 6.8 km || 
|-id=907 bgcolor=#E9E9E9
| 29907 || 1999 JD || — || May 1, 1999 || Monte Agliale || M. Ziboli || EUN || align=right | 3.8 km || 
|-id=908 bgcolor=#E9E9E9
| 29908 ||  || — || May 6, 1999 || Socorro || LINEAR || MAR || align=right | 5.8 km || 
|-id=909 bgcolor=#fefefe
| 29909 ||  || — || May 12, 1999 || Socorro || LINEAR || PHO || align=right | 4.3 km || 
|-id=910 bgcolor=#d6d6d6
| 29910 Segre ||  ||  || May 14, 1999 || Prescott || P. G. Comba || EOS || align=right | 6.7 km || 
|-id=911 bgcolor=#E9E9E9
| 29911 ||  || — || May 8, 1999 || Catalina || CSS || — || align=right | 4.4 km || 
|-id=912 bgcolor=#E9E9E9
| 29912 ||  || — || May 8, 1999 || Catalina || CSS || EUN || align=right | 7.2 km || 
|-id=913 bgcolor=#d6d6d6
| 29913 ||  || — || May 8, 1999 || Catalina || CSS || EOS || align=right | 7.2 km || 
|-id=914 bgcolor=#d6d6d6
| 29914 ||  || — || May 15, 1999 || Catalina || CSS || — || align=right | 12 km || 
|-id=915 bgcolor=#E9E9E9
| 29915 ||  || — || May 10, 1999 || Socorro || LINEAR || — || align=right | 10 km || 
|-id=916 bgcolor=#E9E9E9
| 29916 ||  || — || May 10, 1999 || Socorro || LINEAR || — || align=right | 2.9 km || 
|-id=917 bgcolor=#d6d6d6
| 29917 ||  || — || May 10, 1999 || Socorro || LINEAR || EOS || align=right | 8.8 km || 
|-id=918 bgcolor=#d6d6d6
| 29918 ||  || — || May 10, 1999 || Socorro || LINEAR || THM || align=right | 14 km || 
|-id=919 bgcolor=#d6d6d6
| 29919 ||  || — || May 10, 1999 || Socorro || LINEAR || EOS || align=right | 9.3 km || 
|-id=920 bgcolor=#d6d6d6
| 29920 ||  || — || May 10, 1999 || Socorro || LINEAR || — || align=right | 6.5 km || 
|-id=921 bgcolor=#E9E9E9
| 29921 ||  || — || May 10, 1999 || Socorro || LINEAR || MAR || align=right | 3.5 km || 
|-id=922 bgcolor=#d6d6d6
| 29922 ||  || — || May 10, 1999 || Socorro || LINEAR || — || align=right | 14 km || 
|-id=923 bgcolor=#d6d6d6
| 29923 ||  || — || May 10, 1999 || Socorro || LINEAR || — || align=right | 4.5 km || 
|-id=924 bgcolor=#d6d6d6
| 29924 ||  || — || May 10, 1999 || Socorro || LINEAR || — || align=right | 6.5 km || 
|-id=925 bgcolor=#d6d6d6
| 29925 ||  || — || May 10, 1999 || Socorro || LINEAR || EOS || align=right | 8.5 km || 
|-id=926 bgcolor=#d6d6d6
| 29926 ||  || — || May 10, 1999 || Socorro || LINEAR || — || align=right | 14 km || 
|-id=927 bgcolor=#E9E9E9
| 29927 ||  || — || May 10, 1999 || Socorro || LINEAR || — || align=right | 5.5 km || 
|-id=928 bgcolor=#d6d6d6
| 29928 ||  || — || May 10, 1999 || Socorro || LINEAR || EOS || align=right | 7.3 km || 
|-id=929 bgcolor=#d6d6d6
| 29929 ||  || — || May 10, 1999 || Socorro || LINEAR || HYG || align=right | 8.4 km || 
|-id=930 bgcolor=#E9E9E9
| 29930 ||  || — || May 10, 1999 || Socorro || LINEAR || — || align=right | 7.0 km || 
|-id=931 bgcolor=#d6d6d6
| 29931 ||  || — || May 10, 1999 || Socorro || LINEAR || — || align=right | 20 km || 
|-id=932 bgcolor=#d6d6d6
| 29932 ||  || — || May 10, 1999 || Socorro || LINEAR || — || align=right | 9.6 km || 
|-id=933 bgcolor=#d6d6d6
| 29933 ||  || — || May 10, 1999 || Socorro || LINEAR || — || align=right | 6.8 km || 
|-id=934 bgcolor=#d6d6d6
| 29934 ||  || — || May 10, 1999 || Socorro || LINEAR || — || align=right | 13 km || 
|-id=935 bgcolor=#E9E9E9
| 29935 ||  || — || May 10, 1999 || Socorro || LINEAR || — || align=right | 3.9 km || 
|-id=936 bgcolor=#d6d6d6
| 29936 ||  || — || May 10, 1999 || Socorro || LINEAR || ALA || align=right | 17 km || 
|-id=937 bgcolor=#E9E9E9
| 29937 ||  || — || May 10, 1999 || Socorro || LINEAR || GEF || align=right | 4.8 km || 
|-id=938 bgcolor=#d6d6d6
| 29938 ||  || — || May 10, 1999 || Socorro || LINEAR || KOR || align=right | 4.3 km || 
|-id=939 bgcolor=#d6d6d6
| 29939 ||  || — || May 10, 1999 || Socorro || LINEAR || — || align=right | 8.7 km || 
|-id=940 bgcolor=#d6d6d6
| 29940 ||  || — || May 12, 1999 || Socorro || LINEAR || EOS || align=right | 4.8 km || 
|-id=941 bgcolor=#d6d6d6
| 29941 ||  || — || May 10, 1999 || Socorro || LINEAR || — || align=right | 9.7 km || 
|-id=942 bgcolor=#d6d6d6
| 29942 ||  || — || May 12, 1999 || Socorro || LINEAR || EOS || align=right | 7.1 km || 
|-id=943 bgcolor=#d6d6d6
| 29943 ||  || — || May 13, 1999 || Socorro || LINEAR || — || align=right | 40 km || 
|-id=944 bgcolor=#d6d6d6
| 29944 ||  || — || May 12, 1999 || Socorro || LINEAR || 3:2 || align=right | 16 km || 
|-id=945 bgcolor=#d6d6d6
| 29945 ||  || — || May 12, 1999 || Socorro || LINEAR || — || align=right | 15 km || 
|-id=946 bgcolor=#d6d6d6
| 29946 ||  || — || May 12, 1999 || Socorro || LINEAR || VER || align=right | 11 km || 
|-id=947 bgcolor=#E9E9E9
| 29947 ||  || — || May 12, 1999 || Socorro || LINEAR || GER || align=right | 6.5 km || 
|-id=948 bgcolor=#d6d6d6
| 29948 ||  || — || May 12, 1999 || Socorro || LINEAR || URS || align=right | 14 km || 
|-id=949 bgcolor=#d6d6d6
| 29949 ||  || — || May 15, 1999 || Socorro || LINEAR || — || align=right | 8.8 km || 
|-id=950 bgcolor=#fefefe
| 29950 Uppili ||  ||  || May 12, 1999 || Socorro || LINEAR || NYS || align=right | 2.3 km || 
|-id=951 bgcolor=#d6d6d6
| 29951 ||  || — || May 12, 1999 || Socorro || LINEAR || — || align=right | 11 km || 
|-id=952 bgcolor=#E9E9E9
| 29952 Varghese ||  ||  || May 12, 1999 || Socorro || LINEAR || RAF || align=right | 3.3 km || 
|-id=953 bgcolor=#d6d6d6
| 29953 ||  || — || May 12, 1999 || Socorro || LINEAR || — || align=right | 6.9 km || 
|-id=954 bgcolor=#d6d6d6
| 29954 ||  || — || May 12, 1999 || Socorro || LINEAR || — || align=right | 5.2 km || 
|-id=955 bgcolor=#d6d6d6
| 29955 ||  || — || May 12, 1999 || Socorro || LINEAR || EOS || align=right | 5.4 km || 
|-id=956 bgcolor=#d6d6d6
| 29956 ||  || — || May 12, 1999 || Socorro || LINEAR || — || align=right | 15 km || 
|-id=957 bgcolor=#d6d6d6
| 29957 ||  || — || May 12, 1999 || Socorro || LINEAR || EOS || align=right | 8.3 km || 
|-id=958 bgcolor=#d6d6d6
| 29958 ||  || — || May 12, 1999 || Socorro || LINEAR || — || align=right | 4.8 km || 
|-id=959 bgcolor=#d6d6d6
| 29959 Senevelling ||  ||  || May 12, 1999 || Socorro || LINEAR || 615 || align=right | 5.4 km || 
|-id=960 bgcolor=#d6d6d6
| 29960 ||  || — || May 12, 1999 || Socorro || LINEAR || EOS || align=right | 6.3 km || 
|-id=961 bgcolor=#d6d6d6
| 29961 ||  || — || May 12, 1999 || Socorro || LINEAR || AEG || align=right | 9.8 km || 
|-id=962 bgcolor=#d6d6d6
| 29962 ||  || — || May 12, 1999 || Socorro || LINEAR || — || align=right | 12 km || 
|-id=963 bgcolor=#d6d6d6
| 29963 ||  || — || May 12, 1999 || Socorro || LINEAR || ALA || align=right | 12 km || 
|-id=964 bgcolor=#d6d6d6
| 29964 ||  || — || May 12, 1999 || Socorro || LINEAR || — || align=right | 11 km || 
|-id=965 bgcolor=#d6d6d6
| 29965 ||  || — || May 13, 1999 || Socorro || LINEAR || HYG || align=right | 7.3 km || 
|-id=966 bgcolor=#d6d6d6
| 29966 ||  || — || May 13, 1999 || Socorro || LINEAR || 7:4 || align=right | 11 km || 
|-id=967 bgcolor=#E9E9E9
| 29967 ||  || — || May 15, 1999 || Socorro || LINEAR || — || align=right | 4.5 km || 
|-id=968 bgcolor=#d6d6d6
| 29968 ||  || — || May 13, 1999 || Socorro || LINEAR || — || align=right | 8.5 km || 
|-id=969 bgcolor=#d6d6d6
| 29969 Amyvitha ||  ||  || May 13, 1999 || Socorro || LINEAR || — || align=right | 3.7 km || 
|-id=970 bgcolor=#E9E9E9
| 29970 || 1999 KQ || — || May 16, 1999 || Catalina || CSS || — || align=right | 5.1 km || 
|-id=971 bgcolor=#fefefe
| 29971 || 1999 KT || — || May 16, 1999 || Catalina || CSS || — || align=right | 1.6 km || 
|-id=972 bgcolor=#d6d6d6
| 29972 Chriswan ||  ||  || May 18, 1999 || Socorro || LINEAR || — || align=right | 10 km || 
|-id=973 bgcolor=#d6d6d6
| 29973 ||  || — || June 12, 1999 || Kitt Peak || Spacewatch || SHU3:2 || align=right | 14 km || 
|-id=974 bgcolor=#E9E9E9
| 29974 ||  || — || June 8, 1999 || Socorro || LINEAR || GEF || align=right | 4.5 km || 
|-id=975 bgcolor=#E9E9E9
| 29975 ||  || — || June 8, 1999 || Anderson Mesa || LONEOS || — || align=right | 7.4 km || 
|-id=976 bgcolor=#C2FFFF
| 29976 ||  || — || July 13, 1999 || Socorro || LINEAR || L5 || align=right | 34 km || 
|-id=977 bgcolor=#C2FFFF
| 29977 ||  || — || July 13, 1999 || Socorro || LINEAR || L5 || align=right | 33 km || 
|-id=978 bgcolor=#fefefe
| 29978 Arthurwang ||  ||  || July 14, 1999 || Socorro || LINEAR || NYS || align=right | 2.8 km || 
|-id=979 bgcolor=#fefefe
| 29979 Wastyk ||  ||  || September 7, 1999 || Socorro || LINEAR || V || align=right | 1.9 km || 
|-id=980 bgcolor=#fefefe
| 29980 Dougsimons ||  ||  || September 30, 1999 || Fountain Hills || C. W. Juels || FLO || align=right | 2.6 km || 
|-id=981 bgcolor=#C2E0FF
| 29981 ||  || — || October 3, 1999 || Kitt Peak || Spacewatch || centaurcritical || align=right | 81 km || 
|-id=982 bgcolor=#fefefe
| 29982 Sarahwu ||  ||  || October 4, 1999 || Socorro || LINEAR || — || align=right | 2.2 km || 
|-id=983 bgcolor=#d6d6d6
| 29983 Amyxu ||  ||  || November 4, 1999 || Socorro || LINEAR || THM || align=right | 7.9 km || 
|-id=984 bgcolor=#E9E9E9
| 29984 Zefferer ||  ||  || November 4, 1999 || Socorro || LINEAR || — || align=right | 2.4 km || 
|-id=985 bgcolor=#E9E9E9
| 29985 ||  || — || November 10, 1999 || Catalina || CSS || — || align=right | 5.4 km || 
|-id=986 bgcolor=#fefefe
| 29986 Shunsuke ||  ||  || December 3, 1999 || Kuma Kogen || A. Nakamura || — || align=right | 2.3 km || 
|-id=987 bgcolor=#fefefe
| 29987 Lazhang ||  ||  || December 7, 1999 || Socorro || LINEAR || — || align=right | 2.5 km || 
|-id=988 bgcolor=#fefefe
| 29988 Davidezilli ||  ||  || December 7, 1999 || Socorro || LINEAR || — || align=right | 3.7 km || 
|-id=989 bgcolor=#E9E9E9
| 29989 ||  || — || December 12, 1999 || Socorro || LINEAR || — || align=right | 4.8 km || 
|-id=990 bgcolor=#d6d6d6
| 29990 ||  || — || December 13, 1999 || Socorro || LINEAR || — || align=right | 5.8 km || 
|-id=991 bgcolor=#d6d6d6
| 29991 Dazimmerman ||  ||  || January 3, 2000 || Socorro || LINEAR || — || align=right | 5.9 km || 
|-id=992 bgcolor=#E9E9E9
| 29992 Yasminezubi ||  ||  || January 3, 2000 || Socorro || LINEAR || — || align=right | 3.6 km || 
|-id=993 bgcolor=#d6d6d6
| 29993 ||  || — || January 4, 2000 || Socorro || LINEAR || THM || align=right | 9.2 km || 
|-id=994 bgcolor=#fefefe
| 29994 Zuoyu ||  ||  || January 4, 2000 || Socorro || LINEAR || V || align=right | 2.8 km || 
|-id=995 bgcolor=#fefefe
| 29995 Arshavsky ||  ||  || January 4, 2000 || Socorro || LINEAR || — || align=right | 5.4 km || 
|-id=996 bgcolor=#fefefe
| 29996 ||  || — || January 4, 2000 || Socorro || LINEAR || H || align=right | 1.7 km || 
|-id=997 bgcolor=#fefefe
| 29997 ||  || — || January 5, 2000 || Socorro || LINEAR || KLI || align=right | 6.6 km || 
|-id=998 bgcolor=#fefefe
| 29998 ||  || — || January 4, 2000 || Socorro || LINEAR || — || align=right | 2.1 km || 
|-id=999 bgcolor=#E9E9E9
| 29999 ||  || — || January 4, 2000 || Socorro || LINEAR || — || align=right | 5.2 km || 
|-id=000 bgcolor=#fefefe
| 30000 Camenzind ||  ||  || January 4, 2000 || Socorro || LINEAR || — || align=right | 2.6 km || 
|}

References

External links 
 Discovery Circumstances: Numbered Minor Planets (25001)–(30000) (IAU Minor Planet Center)

0029